Contents: Ancient music – Early history – 1500s – 1510s – 1520s – 1530s – 1540s – 1550s – 1560s – 1570s – 1580s – 1590s – 1600s – 1610s – 1620s – 1630s – 1640s – 1650s – 1660s – 1670s – 1680s – 1690s – 1700s – 1710s – 1720s – 1730s – 1740s – 1750s – 1760s – 1770s – 1780s – 1790s – 1800s – 1810s – 1820s – 1830s – 1840s – 1850s – 1860s – 1870s – 1880s – 1890s – 1900s – 1910s – 1920s – 1930s – 1940s – 1950s – 1960s – 1970s – 1980s – 1990s – 2000s – 2010s – 2020s

This page indexes the individual year in music pages.


2020s 

2023 in music, 2023 in African music, 2023 in Asian music, 2023 in British music, 2023 in American music, 2023 in Canadian music, 2023 in Japanese music, 2023 in Philippine music, 2023 in Scandinavian music, 2023 in South Korean music
Deaths of Gangsta Boo, Jeff Beck, Lisa Marie Presley, Robbie Bachman, Van Conner, David Crosby, Top Topham, Tom Verlaine, Barrett Strong, Burt Bacharach, Trugoy, Wayne Shorter, Steve Mackey, Gary Rossington, Bobby Caldwell, Fuzzy Haskins
2022 in music, 2022 in African music, 2022 in Asian music, 2022 in British music, 2022 in American music, 2022 in Canadian music, 2022 in Japanese music, 2022 in Philippine music, 2022 in Scandinavian music, 2022 in South Korean music
Deaths of Ronnie Spector, Meat Loaf, Jon Zazula, Mark Lanegan, Gary Brooker, Betty Davis, Timmy Thomas, Taylor Hawkins, Chris Bailey, Jewell, Vangelis, Andy Fletcher, Alan White, Ronnie Hawkins, Trouble, Alec John Such, Jim Seals, Olivia Newton-John, Lamont Dozier, PnB Rock, Ramsey Lewis, Jesse Powell, Pharoah Sanders, Coolio, Loretta Lynn, Jerry Lee Lewis, D.H. Peligro, Takeoff, Aaron Carter, Gal Costa, Nik Turner, Keith Levene, Irene Cara, Christine McVie, Jet Black, Thom Bell
Notable releases:
Pink Floyd and Andriy Khlyvnyuk's "Hey, Hey, Rise Up!"
Black Country, New Road's Ants from Up There
Denzel Curry's Melt My Eyez See Your Future
Mitski's Laurel Hell
Big Thief's Dragon New Warm Mountain I Believe in You
Charli XCX's Crash
Rosalía's Motomami
Viagra Boys' Cave World
Black Midi's Hellfire
Zeal & Ardor's Zeal & Ardor
Voivod's Synchro Anarchy
Kendrick Lamar's Mr. Morale & the Big Steppers
JID's The Forever Story
Angel Olsen's Big Time
Harry Styles' Harry's House
Bad Bunny's Un Verano Sin Ti
Beyoncé's Renaissance
Taylor Swift's Midnights
2021 in music, 2021 in African music, 2021 in British music, 2021 in Asian music, 2021 in American music, 2021 in Canadian music, 2021 in European music, 2021 in Japanese music, 2021 in Philippine music, 2021 in Scandinavian music, 2021 in South Korean music
Deaths of Gerry Marsden, Sophie, DMX, Young Dolph, Phil Spector, Gift of Gab, Joey Jordison, Bunny Wailer, Tom T. Hall, Michael Nesmith, Hub, Milford Graves, Anita Lane, Biz Markie, Dusty Hill, Jerzy Matuszkiewicz, Don Everly
Notable releases:
Black Country, New Road's For the First Time
Weezer's OK Human
Julien Baker's Little Oblivions
Lana Del Rey's Chemtrails over the Country Club
Taylor Swift's Fearless (Taylor's Version) and Red (Taylor's Version)
Adele's 30
ABBA's Voyage
Kanye West's Donda
Lana Del Rey's Blue Banisters
Radiohead's Kid A Mnesia
Iron Maiden's Senjutsu
Turnstile's Glow On
Tyler, the Creator's Call Me If You Get Lost
Black Midi's Cavalcade
Little Simz's Sometimes I Might Be Introvert
Injury Reserve's By the Time I Get to Phoenix
Squid's Bright Green Field
Silk Sonic's An Evening with Silk Sonic
JPEGMafia's LP!
Brockhampton's Roadrunner: New Light, New Machine
Lingua Ignota's Sinner Get Ready
Magdalena Bay's Mercurial World
Japanese Breakfast's Jubilee
Olivia Rodrigo's SOUR
Doja Cat's Planet Her
Billie Eilish's Happier Than Ever
Lorde's Solar Power
Halsey's If I Can't Have Love, I Want Power
Coldplay's Music of the Spheres
Floating Points, Pharoah Sanders, and the London Symphony Orchestra's Promises
Godspeed You! Black Emperor's G_d's Pee at State's End!
Madlib's Sound Ancestors
BTS' single Butter
Tomorrow X Together's The Chaos Chapter: Freeze
Chungha's Querencia
NCT Dream's Hot Sauce
Twice's Formula of Love: O+T=＜3
IU's Lilac
Shinee's Don't Call Me
Stray Kids' Noeasy
(G)I-dle's I Burn
Aespa's Savage
Parannoul's To See the Next Part of the Dream
Chai's Wink
Måneskin's Teatro d'ira: Vol. I, which includes the band's commercial breakthrough hit Zitti e buoni, that won the Eurovision Song Contest 2021.
2020 in music, 2020 in African music, 2020 in British music, 2020 in Asian music, 2020 in American music, 2020 in Canadian music, 2020 in European music, 2020 in Japanese music, 2020 in Philippine music, 2020 in Scandinavian music, 2020 in South Korean music
Deaths of Pop Smoke, Neil Peart, Bob Shane, McCoy Tyner, Bill Withers, John Prine, Fred the Godson, Little Richard, Kenny Rogers, Florian Schneider, Joe Diffie, Charlie Daniels, Tim Smith, Eddie Van Halen, Mory Kanté, Krzysztof Penderecki, Ennio Morricone, MF Doom
Notable releases:
Ariana Grande's Positions
Selena Gomez's Rare
Westside Gunn's Pray for Paris
Lady Gaga's Chromatica
Dua Lipa's Future Nostalgia
Yves Tumor's Heaven to a Tortured Mind
Fiona Apple's Fetch the Bolt Cutters
Phoebe Bridgers' Punisher
Run the Jewels's RTJ4
Tame Impala's The Slow Rush
Halsey's Manic
Lil Uzi Vert's Eternal Atake
Testament's Titans of Creation
Taylor Swift's Folklore and Evermore
The Microphones's Microphones in 2020
Paul McCartney's McCartney III
Oneohtrix Point Never's Magic Oneohtrix Point Never
Against All Logic's 2017–2019
Autechre's Sign
Kenshi Yonezu's Stray Sheep
Ichiko Aoba's Windswept Adan
Rina Sawayama's Sawayama
BTS' Map of the Soul: 7 and Be
Blackpink's The Album
NCT's Neo Zone and NCT 2020 Resonance
Twice's Eyes Wide Open
Stray Kids' Go Live
Yukika Teramoto's Soul Lady
BoA's Better
Taemin's Never Gonna Dance Again
Tomorrow X Together's Minisode1: Blue Hour
The COVID-19 pandemic results in the cancellation or postponement of numerous music-related events scheduled to take place this year, including major tours, festivals and television appearances.

2010s 

2019 in music, 2019 in African music, 2019 in American music, 2019 in Asian music, 2019 in British music, 2019 in Canadian music, 2019 in Danish music, 2019 in European music, 2019 in Finnish music, 2019 in Icelandic music, 2019 in Irish music, 2019 in Japanese music, 2019 in Norwegian music, 2019 in Philippine music, 2019 in Scandinavian music, 2019 in South Korean music, 2019 in Swedish music
Deaths of Michel Legrand, André Previn, Doris Duke, Peggy Lipton, Doris Day, Dr. John, João Gilberto, Ric Ocasek, Ginger Baker, Juice WRLD, Keith Flint
Notable releases:
 Maggie Rogers’ Heard It In A Past Life
Ariana Grande's Thank U, Next
Madonna's Madame X
Bring Me the Horizon's Amo
Lewis Capaldi's Divinely Uninspired to a Hellish Extent
Tool's Fear Inoculum
Tyler, The Creator's Igor
Toby Marlow and Lucy Moss' musical Six (originally performed in 2017) debuts in the West End
Charli XCX's Charli
Lana Del Rey's Norman F***ing Rockwell!
Taylor Swift's Lover
FKA Twigs's Magdalene
Freddie Gibbs & Madlib's Bandana
Weyes Blood's Titanic Rising
Carly Rae Jepsen's Dedicated
Nick Cave and the Bad Seeds' Ghosteen
DaBaby' Baby on Baby
Thom Yorke' Anima
BTS' Map of the Soul: Persona
Billie Eilish's When We All Fall Asleep, Where Do We Go?
Babymetal's Metal Galaxy
2018 in music, 2018 in African music, 2018 in American music, 2018 in Australian music, 2018 in British music, 2018 in Canadian music, 2018 in Chinese music, 2018 in Danish music, 2018 in European music, 2018 in Finnish music, 2018 in Icelandic music, 2018 in Japanese music, 2018 in Norwegian music, 2018 in Philippine music, 2018 in Scandinavian music, 2018 in South Korean music, 2018 in Swedish music
Deaths of Hugh Masekela, Tom Rapp, Vic Damone, Fredo Santana, Craig Mack, Avicii, XXXTentacion, Jimmy Wopo, Joe Jackson, Aretha Franklin, Mac Miller, Dolores O'Riordan, Charles Aznavour, Pete Schelley
Notable releases:
Ariana Grande's Sweetener
Christina Aguilera's Liberation
Earl Sweatshirt's Some Rap Songs
Car Seat Headrest's Twin Fantasy (Face to Face), a reworking of their 2011 album Twin Fantasy
Migos' Culture II
Nasty C's Strings and Bling
Camila Cabello's self-titled album
Panic! At the Disco's Pray for the Wicked
Kendrick Lamar's Black Panther: The Album for the 2018 Marvel Cinematic Universe film Black Panther
Cardi B's Invasion of Privacy
Kacey Musgraves's Golden Hour
Parquet Courts' Wide Awake!
A Perfect Circle's Eat the Elephant
Kanye West's Ye
Nas's NASIR
Mac Miller's Swimming
Eminem's Kamikaze
Paul McCartney's Egypt Station
Brockhampton's Iridescence
Kids See Ghosts's self-titled album
Khruangbin's Con Todo el Mundo
Molchat Doma's Etazhi
Daughters' You Won't Get What You Want
Noname's Room 25
Tim Hecker's Konoyo
Jon Hopkins's Singularity
Against All Logic's 2012–2017
BTS' Love Yourself: Tear
Exo's Don't Mess Up My Tempo
Blackpink's Square Up
Monsta X's Take.1 Are You There?
2017 in music, 2017 in African music, 2017 in American music, 2017 in Australian music, 2017 in British music, 2017 in Canadian music, 2017 in Chinese music, 2017 in Danish music, 2017 in European music, 2017 in Finnish music, 2017 in Icelandic music, 2017 in Japanese music, 2017 in Norwegian music, 2017 in Philippine music, 2017 in Scandinavian music, 2017 in South Korean music, 2017 in Swedish music
Deaths of Tom Petty, Chester Bennington, Al Jarreau, Fats Domino, Allan Holdsworth, Chuck Berry, J. Geils, John Wetton, Larry Coryell, Svend Asmussen, Chris Cornell, Gregg Allman, Butch Trucks, Rosalie Sorrels, Prodigy, Glen Campbell, Walter Becker, Grant Hart, Walter "Junie" Morrison, Jaki Liebezeit, Holger Czukay, David Cassidy, Johnny Hallyday, Keely Smith, Malcolm Young, Pierre Henry and Lil Peep
The One Love Manchester event takes place after the devastating Manchester Arena bomb attacks, following an Ariana Grande concert.
Notable releases:
Katy Perry's Witness
Taylor Swift's Reputation
Imagine Dragons' Evolve
Jay Z's 4:44
Linkin Park's One More Light
Sepultura's Machine Messiah
The xx's I See You
Sam Smith's The Thrill of It All
Stormzy's Gang Signs & Prayer
Demi Lovato's Tell Me You Love Me
Dua Lipa's self-titled debut album
Sampha's Process
Ed Sheeran's ÷
Thundercat's Drunk
Lorde's Melodrama
Pasek and Paul's soundtrack to the 20th Century Fox musical film The Greatest Showman
Kendrick Lamar's DAMN.
Rag'n'Bone Man's Human
SZA's Ctrl
Drake's More Life
Smino's blkswn
Tyler, The Creator's Flower Boy
BROCKHAMPTON's Saturation, Saturation II, and Saturation III
Rex Orange County's Apricot Princess
Father John Misty's Pure Comedy
Ryuichi Sakamoto's async
Luis Fonsi and Daddy Yankee, remixing with Justin Bieber release the record breaking hit single Despacito.
2016 in music, 2016 in African music, 2016 in American music, 2016 in Asian music, 2016 in Australian music, 2016 in Brazilian music,2016 in British music, 2016 in Canadian music, 2016 in Chinese music, 2016 in Danish music, 2016 in European music (Continental Europe), 2016 in Finnish music, 2016 in French music, 2016 in German music, 2016 in Icelandic music, 2016 in Indian music, 2016 in Irish music, 2016 in Japanese music, 2016 in Malaysian music, 2016 in Norwegian music, 2016 in Philippine music, 2016 in Scandinavian music, 2016 in South Korean music, 2016 in Swedish music, 2016 in Vietnamese music
Deaths of Juan Gabriel, Paul Bley, Pierre Boulez, Elizabeth Swados, David Bowie, Paul Kantner, Glenn Frey, Leif Solberg, Harald Devold, George Martin, Naná Vasconcelos, Keith Emerson, Merle Haggard, Christina Grimmie, Glenn Yarbrough, Dan Hicks, Maurice White, Pete Burns, John Berry, Vanity, Prince, Oscar Brand, Mose Allison, Nick Menza, the members of Viola Beach, Fred Hellerman, Leonard Cohen, Leon Russell, Sharon Jones, Phife Dawg, Greg Lake and George Michael 
Notable releases:
David Bowie's Blackstar
Chance the Rapper's Coloring Book
Leonard Cohen's You Want It Darker
Gwen Stefani's This Is What the Truth Feels Like
Ariana Grande's Dangerous Woman
Britney Spears' Glory
A Tribe Called Quest's We Got It from Here... Thank You 4 Your Service
Nick Jonas's Last Year Was Complicated
Bruno Mars's 24K Magic
Post Malone's Stoney
Green Day's Revolution Radio
Blink-182's California
Lady Gaga's Joanne
Beyoncé's Lemonade
Drake's Views
Yussef Kamaal's Black Focus
Rihanna's Anti
Tove Lo's Lady Wood
The Weeknd's Starboy
Avenged Sevenfold's The Stage
Metal Church's XI
Metallica's Hardwired... to Self-Destruct
Megadeth's Dystopia
Anthrax's For All Kings
Testament's Brotherhood of the Snake
Bon Jovi's This House Is Not for Sale
Kanye West's The Life of Pablo
Solange's A Seat at the Table
Panic! at the Disco's Death of a Bachelor
Kendrick Lamar's Untitled Unmastered
Childish Gambino's "Awaken, My Love!"
Kings of Leon's Walls
Radiohead's A Moon Shaped Pool
Frank Ocean's Blonde and Endless
BTS' Wings
Babymetal's Metal Resistance
Justin Timberlake's record breaking single "Can't Stop the Feeling" (from the soundtrack to the DreamWorks Animation film Trolls).
2015 in music, 2015 in American music, 2015 in Australian music, 2015 in British music, 2015 in Canadian music, 2015 in Chinese music, 2015 in Danish music, 2015 in European music (Continental Europe), 2015 in Finnish music, 2015 in Icelandic music, 2015 in Indian music, 2015 in Irish music, 2015 in Japanese music, 2015 in Philippine music, 2015 in South Korean music, 2015 in Norwegian music, 2015 in Swedish music
Deaths of Lemmy, Clark Terry, Erik Amundsen, Rod McKuen, John Eaton, Lesley Gore, Percy Sledge, Ben E. King, B.B. King, Jean Ritchie, Ronnie Gilbert, Ornette Coleman, Theodore Bikel, Bob Johnston, Kurt Masur, Nora Brockstedt, Scott Weiland, Svein Christiansen, Gary Richrath, Dallas Taylor, Kim Fowley, James Last and Natalie Cole.
Notable releases:
Twenty One Pilots's Blurryface
Coldplay's A Head Full of Dreams
Blur's The Magic Whip 
Kendrick Lamar's To Pimp A Butterfly
Breaking Benjamin's Dark Before Dawn
Disturbed's Immortalized
Jeff Lynne's ELO's Alone in the Universe
Sufjan Stevens's Carrie & Lowell
Travis Scott's Rodeo
Adele's 25
Iron Maiden's The Book of Souls
Tame Impala's Currents
Kamasi Washington's The Epic
Slayer's Repentless
Madonna's Rebel Heart
Marius Neset's Pinball
Dag Arnesen's Grieg, Tveitt & I
Olga Konkova Trio's The Goldilocks Zone
Death Grips's The Powers That B
Pentatonix's self-titled
Lin-Manuel Miranda's Hamilton
Faith No More's Sol Invictus
Demi Lovato's Confident
Selena Gomez's Revival
Oneohtrix Point Never's Garden of Delete
Carly Rae Jepsen's E•MO•TION
2814's Birth of a New Day
Björk's Vulnicura
Death's Dynamic Shroud.wmv's I'll Try Living Like This
Silento releases his hit song Watch Me (Whip/Nae Nae), that creates a viral dance trend.
Wiz Khalifa and Charlie Puth release "See You Again" for the film, Furious 7, as a tribute to Paul Walker, who died in a car crash.
Jerry Lee Lewis embarks on a final tour of the UK.
2014 in music, 2014 in American music, 2014 in Asian music, 2014 in Australian music, 2014 in Brazilian music, 2014 in British music, 2014 in Canadian music, 2014 in Chinese music, 2014 in European music (Continental Europe), 2014 in Irish music, 2014 in Japanese music, 2014 in New Zealand music, 2014 in Norwegian music, 2014 in Philippine music, 2014 in South Korean music, 2014 in Swedish music
Death of Phil Everly, Pete Seeger, Casey Kasem, Bobby Womack, Tommy Ramone, Johnny Winter, Paco De Lucia, Jack Bruce, Bobby Keys, Joe Cocker
 Ringo Starr and Paul McCartney perform together on 50th anniversary celebration to the Beatles, with performances by various artists. 
Notable releases:
Lady Gaga and Tony Bennett's Cheek to Cheek
Ed Sheeran's x
Linkin Park's The Hunting Party
Slipknot's .5: The Gray Chapter
Coldplay's Ghost Stories
Jackie Evancho's Awakening
Taylor Swift's 1989
Jake Bugg's Shangri-La
Sia's 1000 Forms of Fear
Bob Dylan's The Bootleg Series Vol. 11: The Basement Tapes Complete
J. Cole's 2014 Forest Hills Drive
U2's Songs of Innocence
Beck's Morning Phase
Freddie Gibbs and Madlib's Piñata
Aphex Twin's Syro
Machine Girl's WLFGRL
BadBadNotGood's III
Todd Terje's It's Album Time
Arca's Xen
Babymetal's self-titled debut album
Sam Smith's In the Lonely Hour
Nicki Minaj's Pinkprint
Pharrell Williams's Girl
Exodus' Blood In, Blood Out
Pink Floyd's The Endless River
Mark Ronson teams up with Bruno Mars to record the number one hit single Uptown Funk
2013 in music, 2013 in American music, 2013 in Australian music, 2013 in British music, 2013 in Canadian music, 2013 in European music (Continental Europe), 2013 in Irish music, 2013 in Japanese music, 2013 in Norwegian music, 2013 in South Korean music, 2013 in Swedish music
Death of Patti Page, Cecil Womack, Lil Snupe, Alvin Lee, Clive Burr, Jeff Hanneman, Lou Reed, and Ray Manzarek.
Notable releases:
Robert and Kristen Aunnderson Lopez's soundtrack to the 53rd Disney animated feature Frozen (the highest animated film at the time),
Lorde's Pure Heroine
Lady Gaga's Artpop
Katy Perry's Prism
Justin Timberlake's The 20/20 Experience
Chance The Rapper's Acid Rap
Tyler, The Creator's Wolf
Daft Punk’s Random Access Memories
Boards of Canada’s Tomorrow's Harvest
Oneohtrix Point Never’s R Plus Seven
Tim Hecker’s Virgins
Jon Hopkins’ Immunity
William Onyeabor’s Who is William Onyeabor?
Kyary Pamyu Pamyu releases Nanda Collection
Anamanaguchi releases Endless Fantasy
My Bloody Valentine's m b v
Disclosure's Settle
Jay-Z's Magna Carta Holy Grail
Oneohtrix Point Never's R Plus Seven
Comedy duo Ylvis, releases their viral song, What Does the Fox Say.
Film star Anna Kendrick releases Cups (When I'm Gone) (featured on the soundtrack to the film Pitch Perfect)
2012 in music, 2012 in African music, 2012 in American music, 2012 in Asian music, 2012 in Australian music, 2012 in British music, 2012 in Canadian music, 2012 in European music (Continental Europe), 2012 in Norwegian music, 2012 in Irish music, 2012 in Japanese music, 2012 in New Zealand music, 2012 in Swedish music, 2012 in South Korean music
Death of Ian Bargh, Whitney Houston, Etta James, Ravi Shankar, Davy Jones, Robert B. Sherman, Earl Scruggs, Levon Helm, Adam Yauch, Donna Summer, Robin Gibb, Doc Watson, Bob Welch, Kitty Wells, Jon Lord, Andy Williams, Jenni Rivera, Mitch Lucker, Dietrich Fischer-Dieskau, Dave Brubeck and Richard Rodney Bennett.
The Beach Boys embark on a 2012 world tour celebrating their 50th Anniversary.
Swedish House Mafia announce their break up and embark on One Last Tour.
English singer-songwriter Jake Bugg releases his debut album, Jake Bugg.
Madonna's 12th studio album is released, entitled MDNA. It tops the charts across the globe including the United Kingdom where she becomes the solo artist with the most number one albums and the UK breaks the iTunes pre-order record. To support the album she embarks on The MDNA Tour which grosses over $305 million and becomes the second highest grossing female tour, behind her own Sticky and Sweet Tour.
South Korean pop singer Psy releases his album Psy 6 (Six Rules), Part 1, which includes the viral dance song, Gangnam Style, that becomes the most viewed YouTube video for 5 years.
Nicki Minaj releases her album Pink Friday: Roman Reloaded
Kesha releases Warrior
Taylor Swift releases Red
Tame Impala releases Lonerism
Kyary Pamyu Pamyu releases Pamyu Pamyu Revolution
Kendrick Lamar releases good kid, m.A.A.d city
Frank Ocean releases Channel Orange
Lana Del Rey releases Born to Die
Imagine Dragons release Night Visions
Godspeed You! Black Emperor release 'Allelujah! Don't Bend! Ascend!
Flying Lotus releases Until the Quiet Comes
Blank Banshee releases Blank Banshee 0
2011 in music, 2011 in American music, 2011 in Asian music, 2011 in British music, 2011 in Canadian music, 2011 in European music (Continental Europe), 2011 in Irish music, 2011 in Japanese music, 2011 in Norwegian music, 2011 in Swedish music
Death of Gerry Rafferty, Gary Moore, George Shearing, Mike Starr, Ferlin Husky, Gil Scott-Heron, Clarence Clemons, Amy Winehouse, Sylvia Robinson, Bert Jansch, and Dobie Gray.
English singer Adele released the album 21, which had sold 26.4 million copies worldwide according to the International Federation of the Phonographic Industry, became the best selling album in the past 15 years, and also won six Grammys.
Lady Gaga releases her iconic album Born This Way
Jessie J releases her debut studio album, Who You Are
LMFAO release the album Sorry for Party Rocking
Radiohead release the album The King of Limbs
Vektroid release the album Floral Shoppe
Oneohtrix Point Never releases the album Replica
The Caretaker releases the album An Empty Bliss Beyond This World
Tim Hecker releases the album Ravedeath, 1972
James Ferraro releases the album Far Side Virtual
Rustie releases the album Glass Swords
C418 releases Minecraft – Volume Alpha, the first soundtrack album to the sandbox video game Minecraft
Robert Lopez and South Park creators Trey Parker and Matt Stone team up and create the musical The Book of Mormon.
Gotye releases the album Making Mirrors, which features the number one hit single "Somebody That I Used to Know"
Rebecca Black releases her debut single, "Friday", to scathing reviews, and being the most disliked YouTube video until it was taken down 6 months later.
2010 in music, 2010 in American music, 2010 in Asian music, 2010 in Australian music, 2010 in British music, 2010 in European music (Continental Europe), 2010 in Irish music, 2010 in Japanese music, 2010 in New Zealand music, 2010 in Norwegian music, 2010 in Philippine music, 2010 in Swedish music
Tour of Jerry Lee Lewis.
Metallica, Megadeth, Slayer and Anthrax perform together for the first time as part of the Big 4 shows.
Death of Teddy Pendergrass, Ed Thigpen, Kate McGarrigle, Ronnie James Dio, Peter Steele, Paul Gray, Lena Horne, Jimmy Dean, Tuli Kupferberg, Eddie Fisher, Joan Sutherland and Bobby Farrell.
Notable releases:
Gorillaz's Plastic Beach
Flying Lotus's Cosmogramma
Four Tet's There Is Love in You
Nicki Minaj's Pink Friday
Kanye West's My Beautiful Dark Twisted Fantasy
Katy Perry's Teenage Dream
CeeLo Green's The Lady Killer
Kesha releases her first studio album, Kesha, as well as her first EP, Cannibal.
Yolanda Be Cool's "We No Speak Americano"
Bruno Mars's Doo-Wops and Hooligans
Australian musical project Tame Impala releases his debut album Innerspeaker

2000s 

2009 in music, 2009 in British music, 2009 in Canadian music, 2009 in Irish music, 2009 in Japanese music, 2009 in Norwegian music, 2009 in South Korean music
Deaths of Michael Jackson, James Owen Sullivan, Leon Kirchner, Les Paul, Ali Akbar Khan, Merce Cunningham, Ron Asheton, Henri Pousseur, Mary Travers, Stephen Gately, and Alain Bashung.
Lady Gaga releases The Fame Monster
Britney Spears releases her comeback album Circus which receives critical acclaim.
Flo Rida releases his studio album R.O.O.T.S.. His lead single "Right Round" introduces future pop star Kesha to a mainstream audience.
Noel Gallagher departs from Oasis after a heated confrontation with vocalist and brother Liam Gallagher in Rock en Seine, France leading to the disbandment of Oasis.
Phoenix release  Lisztomania
Animal Collective releases Merriweather Post Pavilion
Owl City releases Ocean Eyes
Michael Bublé release Crazy Love
The Heavy release The House That Dirt Built
The Black Eyed Peas release The E.N.D
Ryuichi Sakamoto release Playing the Piano
Debut of:
Susan Boyle's I Dreamed a Dream
2008 in music, 2008 in British music, 2008 in Canadian music, 2008 in Irish music, 2008 in Japanese music, 2008 in Norwegian music, 2008 in South Korean music
Deaths of Mauricio Kagel, Artie Traum, Wilfrid Mellers, LeRoi Moore, Erik Darling, Isaac Hayes, Bo Diddley, Richard Wright, Nick Reynolds, Mitch Mitchell, Miriam Makeba, Odetta, Eartha Kitt, Freddie Hubbard, and Robert Hazard.
Mariah Carey's "Touch My Body" becomes her 18th U.S. chart-topper, setting the record for most U.S. number ones singles by a solo artist – only behind The Beatles with 20 – and most weeks at number one on the Hot 100 chart with a total of 79.
Lil Wayne released Tha Carter III and sold 1 million copies in the first week, becoming the best selling album of 2008.
Madonna's Sticky and Sweet Tour becomes the highest grossing female tour of all-time (surpassing her own record) and then the highest grossing solo tour of all time. It promotes her 11th studio album Hard Candy which sells 4 million copies and includes the international hit song "4 Minutes".
Kanye West's 808s & Heartbreak
Coldplay's Viva la Vida or Death and All His Friends
Lady Gaga's first studio album, The Fame
Katy Perry releases her first studio album, One of the Boys
Taylor Swift's second studio album, Fearless releases.
Flying Lotus' Los Angeles
Earth's The Bees Made Honey in the Lion's Skull
DJ Sprinkles's Midtown 120 Blues
2007 in music, 2007 in British music, 2007 in Canadian music, 2007 in Irish music, 2007 in Japanese music, 2007 in Norwegian music, 2007 in South Korean music
Deaths of Beverly Sills, Max Roach, Oscar Peterson, Izumi Sakai, Luciano Pavarotti, Karlheinz Stockhausen, and Don Arden.
Live Earth and Led Zeppelin reunion.
Radiohead splits from EMI and independently releases In Rainbows with an online download method of payment that allows the buyer to choose their price.
The Mars Volta releases one of the first USB flash drive albums, as part of their The Bedlam in Goliath.
Kanye West releases Graduation
Mika releases Life in Cartoon Motion
Burial releases Untrue
Arcade Fire release Neon Bible
Animal Collective releases Strawberry Jam
LCD Soundsystem release Sound of Silver
Bon Iver releases For Emma, Forever Ago
Arctic Monkeys release Favourite Worst Nightmare
Panda Bear releases Person Pitch
The National release Boxer
Alcest releases Souvenirs d'un autre monde
M.I.A. releases Kala
Battles releases Mirrored
Justice release Cross
 2006 in music, 2006 in British music, 2006 in Irish music, 2006 in Norwegian music, 2006 in South Korean music, 2006 in Swiss music
Jack Johnson's Sing-A-Longs and Lullabies for the Film Curious George to the Universal Studios' animated feature Curious George
 System of a Down announces hiatus
Taylor Swift releases her debut album, Taylor Swift
 Amy Winehouse releases Back to Black
 My Chemical Romance release The Black Parade
 Rihanna releases A Girl like Me
 Evanescence releases The Open Door
 J Dilla releases Donuts
 Arctic Monkeys release Whatever People Say I Am, That's What I'm Not
 Joanna Newsom releases Ys
 Tool release 10,000 Days
 Brand New release The Devil and God Are Raging Inside Me
 Muse releases Black Holes and Revelations
 Red Hot Chili Peppers release Stadium Arcadium
Deaths of James Brown and Syd Barrett.
 2005 in music, 2005 in British music, 2005 in Irish music, 2005 in Norwegian music, 2005 in South Korean music, 2005 in Swiss music
After four years, Gorillaz release their second studio album, Demon Days.
Mariah Carey releases her 10-million selling The Emancipation of Mimi, the best-selling album of the year worldwide, alongside the album's second single "We Belong Together", the year's most successful single, and the Song of the Decade 2000–2009.
Death of Luther Vandross and John Herald.
Pink Floyd reunion for Live 8.
R. Kelly releases his opera series Trapped in the Closet.
Daft Punk release Human After All
Boris release Pink
Boards of Canada release The Campfire Headphase
Venetian Snares release Rossz Csillag Alatt Született
Madonna releases Confessions on a Dance Floor, her 10th studio album. It wins a Grammy award, Brit award, sells in excess of 12 million copies and has the worldwide hit "Hung Up" which tops the charts in a record-breaking 41 countries.
Kanye West releases his album Late Registration
Musicals first performed:
Monty Python member Eric Idle releases the Monty Python musical Spamalot
Elton John's musical adaptation of the British drama film Billy Elliot, which features the song "Electricity"
Bob Gaudio's biopic Frankie Valli and the Four Seasons musical Jersey Boys 
Debuts by:
Bullet for My Valentine's The Poison
2004 in music, 2004 in British music, 2004 in Irish music, 2004 in Norwegian music, 2004 in South Korean music
Death of Ray Charles and Dimebag Darrell.
Danger Mouse releases The Grey Album, sparking days of electronic disobedience by Internet file sharers against EMI.
Green Day releases American Idiot to critical acclaim.
Madvillain's Madvillainy
MF Doom's Mm..Food
Green Day's American Idiot
Animal Collective's Sung Tongs
Modest Mouse's Good News for People Who Love Bad News
Interpol's Antics
Mastodon's Leviathan
Björk's Medúlla
Eminem's Encore (Eminem album)
Canadian singer Celine Dion became recipient of the Diamond award, and she was honored in 2004 by World Music Awards receiving the best selling female artist of all time.
Debut by:
Kanye West's The College Dropout
The Go! Team's Thunder, Lightning, Strike
Arcade Fire's Funeral
Franz Ferdinand's self-titled album
Notable releases:
Moldovan pop band O-Zone release "Dragostea Din Tei", going on to become an Internet sensation.
2003 in music, 2003 in British music, 2003 in Irish music, 2003 in Norwegian music, 2003 in South Korean music
Death of Nina Simone, Celia Cruz, June Carter Cash, Johnny Cash, Herbie Mann, and John Serry Sr..
Debut by:
Beyoncé Dangerously in Love
Notable releases:
Linkin Park's Meteora
Stephen Schwartz's musical Wicked
Outkast's Speakerboxxx/The Love Below
Robert Lopez and Jeff Marx's Avenue Q
Evanescence's Fallen 
The Black Eyed Peas' Elephunk
Radiohead's Hail to the Thief
Kraftwerk's Tour de France Soundtracks
The White Stripes' Elephant
Sleep's Jerusalem and Dopesmoker
Blink-182's self-titled album
Sweet Trip's Velocity : Design : Comfort
Explosions in the Sky's The Earth Is Not a Cold Dead Place
Boris's Boris at Last -Feedbacker-
MF Doom's Take Me to Your Leader
Nujabes' Metaphorical Music
Four Tet's Rounds
2002 in music, 2002 in British music, 2002 in Norwegian music, 2002 in South Korean music
Deaths of Waylon Jennings, Dave Van Ronk, Layne Staley, Lisa Left-Eye Lopes, Lonnie Donegan, John Entwistle and Joe Strummer.
Beginning of American Idol (initially titled American Idol: The Search for a Superstar) which brings the arrival of first winner Kelly Clarkson.
Alan Jackson releases Drive.
Eminem releases The Eminem Show and "Lose Yourself" from his film 8 Mile, the first rap song of its kind to win an Academy Award for Best Original Song.
Justin Timberlake releases his debut album Justified.
Marc Shaiman's musical adaptation of the film Hairspray first performed.
Junior Senior release D-D-Don't Don't Stop the Beat.
Boards of Canada release Geogaddi
Godspeed You! Black Emperor releases Yanqui U.X.O..
Isis releases Oceanic (Isis album).
 2001 in music, 2001 in British music, 2001 in Norwegian music, 2001 in South Korean music
Deaths of Mimi Fariña, Chet Atkins, Aaliyah, George Harrison, John Lee Hooker, John Phillips, Perry Como, Isaac Stern, and Chuck Schuldiner
Duran Duran is reunited with the original five members and goes on tour for the first time since 1985.
Michael Jackson's last studio album Invincible released.
Gorillaz' self-titled debut album is released.
Daft Punk releases Discovery
Kylie Minogue releases Fever
Comedy legend Mel Brooks'  musical adaptation of his 1967 film The Producers first performed, starring Nathan Lane and Matthew Broderick.
Basement Jaxx release Rooty
Fennesz releases Endless Summer
The Strokes' debut album Is This It is released
Rammstein releases Mutter
Opeth releases Blackwater Park
The Microphones releases The Glow Pt. 2
Muse releases Origin of Symmetry
System of a Down releases Toxicity
Björk releases Vespertine
Alicia Keys releases Songs in A Minor
Shakira releases Laundry Service
Manu Chao releases Próxima Estación: Esperanza
Tool release Lateralus
Cornelius release Point
Hikaru Utada releases Distance
Aphex Twin releases Drukqs
Stars of the Lid releases The Tired Sounds of Stars of the Lid
Autechre releases Confield
Napster's popularity peaks. 
Metallica and Dr. Dre sue Napster over illegal distribution of their music.
Debuts by:
Avenged Sevenfold's Sounding the Seventh Trumpet
My Chemical Romance’s "I Brought You My Bullets, You Brought Me Your Love"
2000 in music, 2000 in British music, 2000 in Norwegian music, 2000 in South Korean music
Mariah Carey becomes the Best-Selling Artist of the Millennium according to the World Music Awards.
Britney Spears' Oops!... I Did It Again sells over 23 million copies and becomes the best-selling album by a female artist of the decade.
Blink-182 enjoy mainstream success (mainly from their hit single "All the Small Things") and lead pop-punk into the 21st Century.
Madonna releases her album Music, which goes on to sell 15 million copies, becomes universally acclaimed, and gets nominated for 5 Grammy awards. It follows her 1998 comeback Ray of Light.
Debuts by:
Linkin Park's Hybrid Theory
Coldplay's Parachutes
Craig David's Born to Do It
The Avalanches' Since I Left You
Notable releases
Eminem's The Marshall Mathers LP
Baha Men's Who Let the Dogs Out?
Outkast's Stankonia
Ayumi Hamasaki's Duty
Mai Kuraki's Delicious Way
Ringo Sheena's Shōso Strip
Boris release Flood
Radiohead's Kid A
Godspeed You! Black Emperor's Lift Your Skinny Fists Like Antennas to Heaven
Vladislav Delay's Vocalcity
The Beatles's 1

List of 10 best-selling albums of the 2000s 
The Beatles – 1 – 31 million – 2000
Norah Jones – Come Away with Me – 26 million – 2002
Backstreet Boys – Black & Blue  – 24 million – 2000
Linkin Park – Hybrid Theory – 24 million – 2000
Britney Spears – Oops!... I Did It Again  – 20 million – 2000
Usher – Confessions – 20 million – 2004
Eminem – The Eminem Show – 19 million – 2002
Eminem – The Marshall Mathers LP – 19 million – 2000
Avril Lavigne – Let Go – 17 million – 2002
Evanescence – Fallen – 17 million – 2003

1990s 

1999 in music, 1999 in British music, 1999 in Norwegian music, 1999 in South Korean music
Arrival of Britney Spears, Coldplay, Jenni Rivera, Christina Aguilera, Jessica Simpson, Slipknot, Muse and Jennifer Lopez.
Deaths of Barış Manço, Rick Danko, Scatman John and Curtis Mayfield.
Notable releases:
Dr. Dre's 2001
Moby's Play
Sigur Rós' Ágætis byrjun
Santana' Supernatural
The Flaming Lips' The Soft Bulletin
Red Hot Chili Peppers's Californication
MF Doom's Operation: Doomsday
Eminem's The Slim Shady LP
The Dismemberment Plan's Emergency & I
Nine Inch Nails' The Fragile
Rage Against the Machine's The Battle of Los Angeles
Opeth's Still Life
Mos Def's Black on Both Sides
Fiona Apple's When the Pawn...
Mr. Bungle's California
Blur's 13
Built to Spill's Keep It Like a Secret
Dream Theater's Metropolis Pt. 2: Scenes from a Memory
The Magnetic Fields' 69 Love Songs
The Roots's Things Fall Apart
Wilco's Summerteeth
Blink-182's Enema of the State
American Football's first self-titled album
Fatboy Slim's You've Come a Long Way, Baby
Lynda Thomas' Mi Día de la Independencia
Jamiroquai's Synkronized
Backstreet Boys' Millennium
Christina Aguilera' self-titled debut album
Lou Bega's Mambo No. 5
Ricky Martin's Livin' la Vida Loca
Eiffel 65's Europop
Hikaru Utada's First Love
Boredoms' Vision Creation Newsun
Darude' Before the Storm
Mogwai's Come On Die Young
Burzum's Hliðskjálf
Mr. Oizo's Analog Worms Attack
Susumu Yokota's Sakura
Trey Parker and Marc Shaiman's soundtrack to the Comedy Central animated film South Park: Bigger, Longer & Uncut
Benny Andersson and Björn Ulvaeus's ABBA musical Mamma Mia! first performed.
1998 in music, 1998 in British music, 1998 in Norwegian music, 1998 in South Korean music
Deaths of:
Frank Sinatra
Hide
Linda McCartney
Lauryn Hill releases The Miseducation of Lauryn Hill.
Neutral Milk Hotel releases In the Aeroplane Over the Sea.
The Offspring releases Americana.
"I Don't Want to Miss a Thing" by Aerosmith, from the Michael Bay film Armageddon, becomes the first song by a rock band to debut at No. 1.
Insane Clown Posse gets dropped from the Walt Disney Company's record label Hollywood Records after the release of The Great Milenko, in order for Disney to prevent a violent Southern Baptist Church protest due to Walt Disney World's Gay Days events.
Madonna releases her seventh studio album Ray of Light which goes on to sell over 16 million copies, become universally acclaimed and win 4 Grammy Awards.
Robbie Williams releases I've Been Expecting You 
Lauryn Hill releases The Miseducation of Lauryn Hill 
Boris release Amplifier Worship
Massive Attack release Mezzanine
System of a Down release their self-titled debut album
Outkast release Aquemini 
Duster release Stratosphere 
Elliott Smith releaseS XO
Refused release The Shape of Punk to Come 
Queens of the Stone Age release self-titled debut album
Belle and Sebastian release The Boy with the Arab Strap 
Black Star release Mos Def & Talib Kweli Are Black Star 
The Smashing Pumpkins release Adore 
Pearl Jam release Yield 
Gorguts release Obscura 
Air release Moon Safari 
Boards of Canada release Music Has the Right to Children
Tortoise release TNT
Autechre releases LP5
Don Caballero releases What Burns Never Returns
Amon Tobin releases Permutation
Dirty Three release Ocean Songs
Gas releases Zauberberg and Königsforst
Andrea Bocelli and Celine Dion release The Prayer from the animated Warner Bros. film Quest for Camelot
Geri Halliwell leaves the Spice Girls
Death releases their final album The Sound of Perseverance.
1997 in music, 1997 in British music, 1997 in Norwegian music, 1997 in South Korean music
Debuts of Backstreet Boys and Robbie Williams (after leaving Take That)
Death of John Denver, Jeff Buckley, Townes Van Zandt, The Notorious B.I.G., Michael Hutchence, and Velvet.
Notable releases:
Lynn Ahrens, Stephen Flaherty, and David Newman's soundtrack to the animated feature film Anastasia.
Radiohead's OK Computer
Björk's Homogenic
Janet Jackson's The Velvet Rope
Mariah Carey's #1's, selling 17 million copies.
Blur release the single "Song 2" to a chart-topping success.
Celine Dion's Let's Talk About Love, which sold over 31 million copies worldwide. Lead single "My Heart Will Go On", from the James Cameron film Titanic, became the best selling single of the year and the second best selling single by a female artist of all time.
Elton John and Tim Rice's musical version of the Disney Animation film The Lion King
The Verve's Urban Hymns
Shania Twain's Come On Over
Elliott Smith's Either/Or
Modest Mouse's The Lonesome Crowded West
Spiritualized's Ladies and Gentlemen We Are Floating in Space
Portishead's self-titled debut album
Yo La Tengo's I Can Hear the Heart Beating as One
Built to Spill's Perfect from Now On
Ween's The Mollusk
Deftones' Around the Fur
The Prodigy's The Fat of the Land
Metallica's Reload
Blur's self-titled album
Foo Fighters' The Colour and the Shape
Stereolab's Dots and Loops
Buena Vista Social Club's self-titled debut album
Daft Punk's Homework
Godspeed You! Black Emperor's F♯ A♯ ∞
Mogwai's Mogwai Young Team
The Chemical Brothers' Dig Your Own Hole
Biosphere's Substrata
Squarepusher's Hard Normal Daddy
Autechre's Chiastic Slide
Amon Tobin's Bricolage
Christoph de Babalon's If You're Into It, I'm Out of It
Fishmans' Uchū Nippon Setagaya
Fantastic Plastic Machine's self-titled debut album
Cornelius' Fantasma
1996 in music, 1996 in British music, 1996 in Norwegian music, 1996 in South Korean music
Death of Ella Fitzgerald, Tupac Shakur, Zeki Müren and Brad Nowell.
Arrival of Lynda Thomas, Spice Girls.
Guns N' Roses break up, later reuniting for 2008's Chinese Democracy.
Pink Floyd disband.
Celine Dion released the album Falling into You, selling over 32 million copies worldwide.
Max Cavalera leaves Sepultura, later going on to form Soulfly.
Notable releases:
Sepultura's Roots
Jonathan Larson's Rent
Michael Flatley's Lord of the Dance
Jamiroquai's Travelling Without Moving
Spice Girls' Spice
DJ Shadow's Endtroducing.....
Weezer's Pinkerton
Fishmans' Long Season
Tool's Ænima
Aphex Twin's Richard D. James Album
Belle and Sebastian's If You're Feeling Sinister
Swans' Soundtracks for the Blind
Burzum's Filosofem
Beck's Odelay
Outkast ATLiens
Metallica's Load
Tortoise's Millions Now Living Will Never Die
Toshinori Kondo and DJ Krush's Ki-Oku
Debut album:
Supergrass's I Should Coco
Neutral Milk Hotel's On Avery Island 
Jay-Z Reasonable Doubt
Robert Miles's Dreamland 
1995 in music, 1995 in British music, 1995 in Norwegian music, 1995 in South Korean music
A year after they debuted in the 1994 Eurovision Song Contest, the dance show Riverdance is first performed.
Michael Jackson releases HIStory: Past, Present and Future, Book I, the best-selling multi-disc album of all time. This double album contains "You Are Not Alone" – the first single ever to enter the Billboard Hot 100 at number one.
Death of Jerry Garcia, Dean Martin, Phyllis Hyman, Selena, Burl Ives, and Eazy-E.
Mariah Carey becomes the first female artist in history to have a song debut at number one with Fantasy.
 Coolio and L.V. release the award-winning single "Gangsta's Paradise" from the film Dangerous Minds
 Mariah Carey and band Boyz II Men releases the multiple-record holding "One Sweet Day", the single with the most weeks at number and the Song of the Decade 1990–1999.
 Italian tenor Andrea Bocelli first performs and releases the acclaimed opera song "Con te partirò".
 Italian DJ Robert Miles releases his debut single "Children" to universal acclaim.
Los del Río release "Macarena", the record breaking dance song of all time.
Queen releases their final album Made in Heaven following the death of frontman Freddie Mercury.
Notable releases:
Death's Symbolic
The Smashing Pumpkins' Mellon Collie and the Infinite Sadness
Radiohead's The Bends
Björk's Post
Oasis' (What's the Story) Morning Glory?
GZA's Liquid Swords
Death's Symbolic
Elliott Smith's self-titled album
Mobb Deep's The Infamous Mobb Deep
Pulp's Different Class
Swans' The Great Annihilator
Ulver's Bergtatt – Et eeventyr i 5 capitler
PJ Harvey's To Bring You My Love
Pavement's Wowee Zowee
Raekwon's Only Built 4 Cuban Linx...
The Chemical Brothers' Exit Planet Dust
Sonic Youth's Washing Machine
David Bowie's Outside
Alice in Chains' self-titled album
Dissection's Storm of the Light's Bane
Blur's The Great Escape
Three 6 Mafia's Mystic Stylez
Aphex Twin's ...I Care Because You Do
Autechre's Tri Repetae
Slowdive's Pygmalion
Oval's 94 Diskont
Porcupine Tree's The Sky Moves Sideways
Hallucinogen's Twisted
Scatman John's Scatman's World featuring the hit song "Scatman (Ski-Ba-Bop-Ba-Dop-Bop)"
1994 in music, 1994 in British music, 1994 in Norwegian music
Deaths of:
Dinah Shore
Kurt Cobain
Debuts by: 
Oasis (Definitely Maybe)
Weezer (The Blue Album)
Brandy (Brandy)
Nas (Illmatic)
The Notorious B.I.G. (Ready to Die)
Portishead (Dummy)
Sunny Day Real Estate (Diary)
Other albums released:
Pink Floyd's The Division Bell, their last album until 2014's The Endless River.
Madonna's Bedtime Stories
Blur's Parklife
Green Day's major-label debut, Dookie, with the hits "Longview", "Welcome to Paradise", "Basket Case", "When I Come Around" and "She".
The Offspring's Smash
Common's Resurrection
Soundgarden's Superunknown
R.E.M.'s Monster
NOFX's Punk in Drublic
Jeff Buckley's Grace
Aphex Twin's Selected Ambient Works Volume II
Global Communication's 76:14
Nine Inch Nails' The Downward Spiral
Nirvana's live album MTV Unplugged in New York
Bad Religion's Stranger Than Fiction. With this album, the band earned their first (and only) US gold record in its 15-year career.
Mariah Carey's Merry Christmas, with its multi-platinum lead single "All I Want for Christmas Is You", which eventually becomes the nineteenth best-selling digital single of the 20th century.
Beck's major-label debut, Mellow Gold.
The Prodigy's Music for the Jilted Generation.
1993 in music, 1993 in British music, 1993 in Norwegian music
 Debuts by:
 Cynic (Focus)
 Rancid (Rancid)
 Snoop Doggy Dogg (Doggystyle)
 Tool (Undertow)
 Wu-Tang Clan (Enter the Wu-Tang)
 Radiohead (Pablo Honey)
 Björk (Debut)
 Autechre (Incunabula)
 Earth (Earth 2)
 Seefeel (Quique)
Nirvana release their final album, titled In Utero.
Birth of Ariana Grande
Deaths of Frank Zappa, Marian Anderson, and Dizzy Gillespie.
Mariah Carey releases her 32-million selling Music Box album.
Bad Religion signs to Atlantic Records, where the band later achieves success.
 Other albums released:
 Death's Individual Thought Patterns
 Duran Duran's The Wedding Album
 Morbid Angel's Covenant
 Pestilence's Spheres
 Sepultura's Chaos A.D.
 Sting's Ten Summoner's Tales
 Slowdive's Souvlaki
 The Smashing Pumpkins' Siamese Dream
 A Tribe Called Quest's Midnight Marauders
 Pearl Jam's Vs.
 Meat Loaf's Bat Out of Hell II: Back into Hell
 Orbital's Orbital
1992 in music, 1992 in British music, 1992 in Norwegian music, 1992 in South Korean music
 Debuts by:
 Body Count (Body Count)
 Aphex Twin (Selected Ambient Works 85–92)
 Dr. Dre (The Chronic)
 The Future Sound of London (Accelerator)
 Pavement (Slanted and Enchanted)
 Rage Against the Machine (Rage Against the Machine)
 Stone Temple Pilots (Core)
 Sublime (40oz. to Freedom)
 Therapy? (Nurse)
 Red House Painters (Down Colorful Hill)
 Ugly Kid Joe (America's Least Wanted)
 Tori Amos (Little Earthquakes)
Death of John Cage and Yutaka Ozaki.
U2 start the Zoo TV Tour
Freddie Mercury Tribute Concert
Birth of Selena Gomez
Other releases:
R.E.M.'s Automatic for the People
Alice in Chains' Dirt
Sonic Youth's Dirty
Dream Theater's Images and Words
Pantera's Vulgar Display of Power
Tom Waits' Bone Machine
Darkthrone's A Blaze in the Northern Sky
Megadeth's Countdown to Extinction
Kyuss' Blues for the Red Sun
The Cure's Wish
Sade's Love Deluxe
Beastie Boys' Check Your Head
The Orb's U.F.Orb
Madonna's sexually-provocative book Sex, which was accompanied by the double-platinum album Erotica. It becomes one of the most controversial books and albums ever released, but enjoys commercial success. From it, Madonna made $500 million for her label.
The soundtrack to the film The Bodyguard, the best selling soundtrack album of all time, selling over 45 million copies worldwide to date. Its leading single "I Will Always Love You" became the best selling single by a female artist (Whitney Houston) of all time, selling over 15 million copies.
Faith No More's Angel Dust
Obituary's The End Complete
Artificial Intelligence, Warp's compilation album by various artists is released.
Japanese pop band Dreams Come True release their album The Swinging Star, whose track Sweet Sweet Sweet originated as the ending theme of the Sega Genesis video game Sonic the Hedgehog 2, for which Masato Nakamura composed the music.
1991 in music, 1991 in British music, 1991 in Norwegian music
 Debut albums by:
 Blur (Leisure)
 Cypress Hill (Cypress Hill)
 EMF (Schubert Dip)
 The Infectious Grooves (The Plague That Makes Your Booty Move...It's the Infectious Grooves)
 Kyuss (Wretch)
 The Wiggles (self-titled) 
 Pearl Jam (Ten)
 The Smashing Pumpkins (Gish)
 Beck (Golden Feelings)
 Massive Attack (Blue Lines)
 LFO (Frequencies)
 The Orb (The Orb's Adventures Beyond the Ultraworld)
 Orbital (Orbital)
 Electronic (Electronic)
 Biosphere (Microgravity)
 Nightmares on Wax (A Word of Science: The First and Final Chapter)
Arrival of Blue Man Group
Death of Miles Davis, Freddie Mercury, Eric Carr, Steve Clark.
Notable releases:
Death's Human
Michael Jackson's Dangerous
Metallica's Metallica
Morbid Angel's Blessed Are the Sick
Andrew Lloyd Webber's musical adaptation of the 1950 film Sunset Boulevard
Enya's Shepherd Moons
Nirvana's Nevermind
Bryan Adams's "(Everything I Do) I Do It For You" from the film Robin Hood: Prince of Thieves   
Pestilence's Testimony of the Ancients
Sepultura's Arise
U2's Achtung Baby
The KLF's The White Room
808 State's ex:el
Kraftwerk's The Mix
Ultramarine's Every Man and Woman Is a Star
Primal Scream's Screamadelica
Red Hot Chili Pepper's Blood Sugar Sex Magik
Sonny Sharrock's Ask the Ages
Mariah Carey wins the Grammy Award for Best New Artist. Mariah Carey becomes the only artist in history to have their first 5 consecutive singles reach number one in the United States.
1990 in music, 1990 in British music, 1990 in Norwegian music
Debut albums by Alice in Chains (Facelift), Cannibal Corpse (Eaten Back to Life), Mariah Carey (Mariah Carey), Deee-Lite (World Clique), Green Day (39/Smooth), Helmet (Strap It On), Ice Cube (AmeriKKKa's Most Wanted), Primus (Frizzle Fry), Ride (Nowhere) and A Tribe Called Quest (People's Instinctive Travels and the Paths of Rhythm) are released.
Death of Sarah Vaughan, Leonard Bernstein, Luigi Nono, Johnnie Ray, and Sammy Davis, Jr..
Milli Vanilli becomes exposed as a music fraud.
The Three Tenors; Plácido Domingo, José Carreras and Luciano Pavarotti give their first concert, at the Baths of Caracalla in Rome, with recording of the concert turned into Carreras Domingo Pavarotti in Concert, becoming the fastest-selling classical album of all time.
Notable releases:
Slayer's Seasons in the Abyss
Obituary's Cause of Death
Pantera's Cowboys from Hell
Megadeth's Rust in Peace
Judas Priest's Painkiller
Depeche Mode's Violator
Cocteau Twins's Heaven or Las Vegas
Sonic Youth's Goo
Fugazi's Repeater
Ride's Nowhere
Pixies' Bossanova
Sinéad O'Connor' I Do Not Want What I Haven't Got

List of 10 best-selling albums of the 1990s 
Whitney Houston / Various artists – The Bodyguard – 45 million – 1992
Shania Twain – Come on Over – 40 million – 1997
Alanis Morissette – Jagged Little Pill – 33 million – 1995
Mariah Carey – Music Box – 32 million – 1993
Celine Dion – Falling into You – 32 million – 1996
Michael Jackson – Dangerous – 32 million – 1991
Celine Dion – Let's Talk About Love – 31 million – 1997
Madonna – The Immaculate Collection – 30 million – 1990
Britney Spears – ...Baby One More Time – 30 million – 1999
Backstreet Boys – Millennium – 30 million – 1999

1980s 

 1989 in music, 1989 in British music, 1989 in Norwegian music
 The swing revival is agreed upon to have started around 1989.
 Debut albums are released by:
 3rd Bass (The Cactus Album)
 De La Soul (3 Feet High and Rising)
 The D.O.C. (No One Can Do It Better)
 Morbid Angel (Altars of Madness)
 Nine Inch Nails (Pretty Hate Machine)
 Nirvana (Bleach)
 Obituary (Slowly We Rot)
 The Offspring (The Offspring)
 The Stone Roses (The Stone Roses)
 Other notable releases:
 Janet Jackson's Rhythm Nation 1814
 Madonna's Like A Prayer
 Mötley Crüe's Dr. Feelgood, one of the notable hard rock/heavy metal albums to top the Billboard 200
 Fine Young Cannibals' The Raw & the Cooked
 Pestilence's Consuming Impulse
 Sepultura's Beneath the Remains
 Phil Collins' ...But Seriously
 Alain Boublil and Claude-Michel Schönberg's musical Miss Saigon first performed
 Kate Bush's The Sensual World
 808 State's 90
 "Weird Al" Yankovic's soundtrack to the film UHF
 Ice Cube departs from N.W.A after financial problems and several conflicts with their manager Jerry Heller and the group's founder Eazy-E, and begins a solo career.
 1988 in music, 1988 in British music, 1988 in Norwegian music
 Debut albums are released by:
 Biz Markie (Goin' Off)
 Tracy Chapman (Tracy Chapman)
 Danzig (Danzig)
 Eazy-E (Eazy-Duz-It)
 EPMD (Strictly Business)
 Jane's Addiction (Nothing's Shocking)
 Living Colour (Vivid)
 Morrissey (Viva Hate)
 N.W.A (Straight Outta Compton)
 NOFX (Liberal Animation)
 Pestilence (Malleus Maleficarum)
 The Pixies (Surfer Rosa)
 Soundgarden (Ultramega OK)
 Other albums released:
 Bon Jovi's New Jersey, which charts five consecutive Top 10 hits on the Billboard Hot 100, the most ever for a hard rock album
 Bad Religion's Suffer
 Enya's Watermark
 Bathory's Blood Fire Death, marking the arrival of the Viking metal genre
 Steve Roach's Dreamtime Return
 Nurse with Wound's Soliloquy for Lilith
 Kino's Gruppa krovi
 Whitney Houston with "Where Do Broken Hearts Go" all peaked at number one on the US Hot 100 chart, which gave her a total of seven consecutive number one hits, breaking the record of six previously shared by The Beatles and the Bee Gees.
 Formation of the Traveling Wilburys
 Death of Roy Orbison
 Births of:
 Adele
 Big Sean
 Rihanna
 1987 in music, 1987 in British music, 1987 in Norwegian music
 Notable releases:
 Anthrax's Among the Living
 Michael Jackson's Bad, which is the first album to have 5 consecutive No. 1 hits on the Billboard Hot 100.
 Whitney Houston's Whitney
 Sepultura's Schizophrenia
 Def Leppard's Hysteria
 U2's The Joshua Tree, with the No. 1 hits "With or Without You", "I Still Haven't Found What I'm Looking For" and "Where the Streets Have No Name" 
 Joe Satriani's Surfing with the Alien
 The Beastie Boys' debut Licensed to Ill, released the year before, becomes the first hip hop record to reach number one on the Billboard 200.
 Death of legendary record producer John H. Hammond.
 Debuts by:
 Death (Scream Bloody Gore)
 Guns N' Roses (Appetite for Destruction)
 Testament (The Legacy)
 Rick Astley (Whenever You Need Somebody) which features the lead single "Never Gonna Give You Up"
 1986 in music, 1986 in British music, 1986 in Norwegian music 
 Aerosmith re-records "Walk This Way" with rap group Run-D.M.C. which blends rock and rap music, introduces rap music to a mainstream audience for the first time, and marks the beginning of the resurrection of Aerosmith's career, one of rock's most remarkable comebacks.
 Following their extraordinary performance at Live Aid, Queen put on a special concert at Wembley Stadium.
 Debuts by:
 Sepultura (Morbid Visions)
 Notable releases:
 Bon Jovi's Slippery When Wet which stays at No. 1 on the Billboard 200 for 4 weeks
 Metallica's Master of Puppets
 Megadeth's Peace Sells... But Who's Buying
 Slayer's Reign in Blood
 Peter Gabriel's So
 Europe's The Final Countdown
 The Smiths' The Queen Is Dead
 Sonic Youth's Evol
 Beastie Boys' Licensed to Ill
 Iron Maiden's Somewhere in Time
 Big Black's Atomizer
 The soundtrack album to the film Top Gun is released.
 Paul Simon's Graceland
 Kraftwerk's Electric Café
 Genesis' Invisible Touch
 Andrew Lloyd Webber's musical The Phantom of the Opera first performed
 First performance of Stephen Sondheim's fairy tale musical Into the Woods
 Janet Jackson's Control
 John Farnham's Whispering Jack
 Hiroshi Yoshimura's Green
 Madonna's True Blue, which goes on to sell over 25 million copies and becomes the best-selling female album of the decade.
 Deaths of:
 Benny Goodman
 Richard Manuel
 Cliff Burton
 1985 in music, 1985 in British music, 1985 in Norwegian music 
 Death of Ricky Nelson
 Live Aid and Farm Aid benefit concerts take place.
 Duran Duran records "A View to a Kill" to the James Bond movie of the same name. This single remains the only Bond theme to go to Number 1 on the US charts, and the highest-placed Bond theme on the UK chart where it reached Number 2.
 The famous hard rock band Guns N' Roses was formed in Los Angeles.
 Debuts by:
 Exodus (Bonded by Blood)
 Whitney Houston (self-titled)
 Megadeth (Killing Is My Business... and Business Is Good!)
 Overkill (Feel the Fire)
 A-ha's (Hunting High and Low)
 Notable releases:
 Alain Boublil and Claude-Michel Schönberg's musical Les Misérables first performed in London
 Phil Collins' No Jacket Required
 Dead or Alive's Youthquake which features the hit single "You Spin Me Right Round"
 Falco's "Rock Me Amadeus" 
 Slayer's Hell Awaits
 Tears for Fears' Songs from the Big Chair
 Billy Joel's Greatest Hits – Volume I & Volume II
 1984 in music, 1984 in British music, 1984 in Norwegian music 
 Deaths of:
 Marvin Gaye
 Jackie Wilson
 Akhnaten by Philip Glass premieres in Stuttgart
 Notable releases:
 The Bob Marley & The Wailers compilation album Legend, the best-selling reggae album of all time
 Madonna's Like A Virgin
 Mercyful Fate's Don't Break the Oath
 Metallica's Ride the Lightning
 Prince's soundtrack to the film Purple Rain
 Tina Turner's Private Dancer
 Van Halen's 1984, which contains the No. 1 single "Jump" and becomes their last studio album to feature David Lee Roth on vocals until 2012's A Different Kind of Truth
 Red Hot Chili Peppers' self-titled debut album
 Bruce Springsteen's Born in the U.S.A.
 Hüsker Dü's Zen Arcade
 Manuel Göttsching's E2-E4
 Yngwie Malmsteen's Rising Force
 Mariya Takeuchi's Variety
 Tatsuro Yamashita's soundtrack to the Japanese film Big Wave
 Debuts by:
 Anthrax (Fistful of Metal)
 Bathory (self-titled)
 Bon Jovi (self-titled)
 Celtic Frost (Morbid Tales)
 Yngwie Malmsteen (Rising Force)
 Metal Church (self-titled)
 Ratt (Out of the Cellar)
 Voivod (War and Pain)
 W.A.S.P. (self-titled)
 Musicals first performed:
 Stephen Sondheim's Sunday in the Park with George
 Andrew Lloyd Webber's Starlight Express
 Duran Duran was the first group ever to utilize a monitor in concert to project their performance.
 R. Murray Schafer's Concerto for flute and orchestra performed featuring Robert Aitken on flute.
 Band Aid, a group of familiar music names, is formed to perform "Do They Know It's Christmas?"
 Michael Jackson's album Thriller wins a record-breaking 8 Grammy Awards at the 1984 Grammys.
 1983 in music, 1983 in British music, 1983 in Norwegian music 
 Death of Muddy Waters
 Notable releases:
 Accept's Balls to the Wall
 Def Leppard's Pyromania
 Iron Maiden's Piece of Mind
 David Bowie's Let's Dance
 Mötley Crüe's Shout at the Devil
 New Order's Power, Corruption & Lies and "Blue Monday", the biggest-selling 12-inch record of all time.
 Ozzy Osbourne's Bark at the Moon
 Willy Russell's musical Blood Brothers
 The Police's Synchronicity
 ZZ Top's Eliminator
 U2's War
 Cocteau Twins's Head over Heels
 Pink Floyd's The Final Cut
 Brian Eno's Apollo: Atmospheres and Soundtracks
 Asia Alpha
 Quiet Riot's Metal Health, which is the first heavy metal album to reach number one on the Billboard 200.
 Debuts by:
 D.R.I. (Dirty Rotten EP/LP)
 Dio (Holy Diver)
 Dokken (Breaking the Chains)
 Cyndi Lauper (She's So Unusual)
 Madonna (self-titled)
 Mercyful Fate (Melissa)
 Metallica (Kill 'Em All)
 Pantera (Metal Magic)
 Queensrÿche (self-titled EP)
 R.E.M. (Murmur)
 Slayer (Show No Mercy)
 Sonic Youth (Confusion Is Sex)
 Suicidal Tendencies (self-titled)
 Tears for Fears (The Hurting)
 Wham! (Fantastic)
 Stevie Ray Vaughan (Texas Flood)
 "Weird Al" Yankovic (self-titled)
 Irene Cara releases her top hit "Flashdance... What a Feeling".
 Notable releases
 Now That's What I Call Music
 1982 in music, 1982 in British music, 1982 in Norwegian music 
 The compact disc is introduced.
 Blondie disband.
 Ronnie James Dio leaves Black Sabbath and forms Dio.
 Metallica makes its debut on record, appearing on the first Metal Massacre compilation album. "Hit the Lights", the track recorded for this compilation album, would be re-recorded a year later for their debut album Kill 'Em All.
 Deaths of:
 Thelonious Monk
 Lightnin' Hopkins
 Glenn Gould
 Randy Rhoads
 Debuts by:
 Asia (Asia)
 Descendents (Milo Goes to College)
 Notable releases:
 Accept's Restless and Wild
 Phil Collins' Hello, I Must Be Going!
 Duran Duran's Rio
 INXS' Shabooh Shoobah
 Iron Maiden's The Number of the Beast
 Alan Menkin's musical Little Shop of Horrors first performed 
 Judas Priest's Screaming for Vengeance
 Michael Jackson's Thriller, the best-selling album of all time.
 Toto's Toto IV
 The Cure's Pornogarphy
 Kate Bush's The Dreaming
 Bruce Springsteen's Nebraska
 Bad Brains's Bad Brains
 The Clash's Combat Rock
 Roxy Music's Avalon
 Rush's Signals
 Venom's Black Metal, coining the term which would later be associated with the black metal genre.
 Prince's 1999
 Tatsuro Yamashita's For You
 Survivor release their top hit "Eye of the Tiger" from the soundtrack to the film Rocky III
 1981 in music, 1981 in British music, 1981 in Norwegian music 
 MTV first airs
 Death of Bob Marley
 Bands formed:
 Anthrax
 Asia
 Metallica
 Mötley Crüe
 Slayer
 Tears for Fears
 Musicals first performed:
 Andrew Lloyd Webber's Cats (which becomes the first megamusical)
 Henry Krieger's Dreamgirls
 Debuts by:
 Phil Collins (Face Value)
 Duran Duran (self-titled)
 Mötley Crüe (Too Fast for Love)
 Venom (Welcome to Hell)
 Depeche Mode (Speak & Spell)
 Notable releases:
 Genesis' Abacab
 Queen's Greatest Hits
 Rush's Moving Pictures
 The Human League's Dare
 The Police's Ghost in the Machine
 Grace Jones's Nightclubbing
 Electric Light Orchestra's Time
 Brian Eno and David Byrne's My Life in the Bush of Ghosts
 Glenn Branca's The Ascension
 Jean-Michel Jarre's Les Chants Magnétiques
 Kraftwerk's Computer World
 Yellow Magic Orchestra's BGM and Technodelic
 Eiichi Ohtaki's A Long Vacation
 1980 in music, 1980 in British music, 1980 in Norwegian music 
 Deaths of:
 Ian Curtis
 Bon Scott
 John Lennon
 John Bonham
 Tim Hardin
 Vinicius de Moraes
 Debuts by:
 U2 (Boy)
 Bryan Adams (self-titled)
 Iron Maiden (self-titled)
 Sheena Easton (Take My Time)
 Bauhaus (In the Flat Field)
 Notable releases:
 AC/DC's Back in Black
 Joy Division's Closer
 Dead Kennedys' Fresh Fruit for Rotting Vegetables
 The Cure's Seventeen Seconds
 Black Sabbath's Heaven and Hell
 Queen's The Game
 Dead Kennedys' Fresh Fruit for Rotting Vegetables
 Kate Bush's Never for Ever
 Judas Priest's British Steel
 The Feelies' Crazy Rhythms
 Motörhead's Ace of Spades
 David Bowie's Scary Monsters (and Super Creeps) 
 Michael Stewart, Mark Bramble, Al Dubin, Johnny Mercer and  Harry Warren's 42nd Street
 Rush's Permanent Waves
 Talking Heads' Remain in Light
 Swell Maps' Jane from Occupied Europe
 Tatsuro Yamashita' Ride on Time

1970s 

 1979 in music, 1979 in British music, 1979 in Norwegian music
Deaths of:
Richard Rodgers
Charles Mingus
Sid Vicious
Birth of Norah Jones
The Sony Walkman goes on sale
Notable releases:
The Clash's London Calling
Pink Floyd's The Wall
Earth, Wind & Fire – I Am
Sister Sledge's We Are Family
Michael Jackson's Off the Wall
Donna Summer's Bad Girls
Stephen Sondheim's Sweeney Todd: The Demon Barber of Fleet Street first performed
Anita Ward's "Ring My Bell"
Public Image Ltd.'s Metal Box
Elvis Costello's Armed Forces
AC/DC's Highway to Hell
David Bowie's Lodger
Wire's 154
Led Zeppelin's In Through the Out Door
Supertramp's Breakfast in America
ABBA's Voulez-Vous
The B-52's' self-titled debut album
Motörhead's Overkill and Bomber
Electric Light Orchestra's Discovery
Van Halen's Van Halen II
Joy Division's Unknown Pleasures
Talking Heads's Fear of Music
Gang of Four's Entertainment!
Scorpions's Lovedrive
Yellow Magic Orchestra's Solid State Survivor
Casiopea's self-titled debut album
Univers Zero's Heresie
Sugarhill Gang's "Rapper's Delight", noted as the official birth of rap music
 1978 in music, 1978 in British music, 1978 in Norwegian music
Notable releases:
The Who's Who Are You
Kate Bush's The Kick Inside
Gloria Gaynor's Love Tracks which includes her million-selling No. 1 hit single "I Will Survive".
Blondie's Parallel Lines
Funkadelic's One Nation Under a Groove
 Jeff Wayne's Musical Version of The War of the Worlds
Devo's Q. Are We Not Men? A: We Are Devo!
Queen's Jazz
Talking Heads's More Songs About Buildings and Food
Chic's C'est Chic
Olivia Newton-John and John Travolta's soundtrack album to the musical film Grease
Brian Eno's Ambient 1: Music for Airports
Jean-Michel Jarre's Équinoxe
Klaus Schulze's X
Kraftwerk's The Man-Machine
Boney M.'s Nightflight to Venus
Haruomi Hosono and Yellow Magic Band's Paraiso
Haruomi Hosono,  Shigeru Suzuki, and Tatsuro Yamashita's Pacific, the Omnibus album which contains a prototype version of Hosono's famous track Cosmic Surfin that would later be upgraded in YMO's debut album the same year.
Death of Keith Moon
Debuts by:
Prince (For You)
Van Halen (Van Halen)
Dire Straits (Dire Straits)
Public Image Ltd. (Public Image: First Issue)
The Blues Brothers (Briefcase Full of Blues)
The Police (Outlandos d'Amour)
Ryuichi Sakamoto (Thousand Knives)
Yellow Magic Orchestra (Yellow Magic Orchestra)
 1977 in music, 1977 in British music, 1977 in Norwegian musicSex Pistols release Never Mind the Bollocks, Here's the Sex Pistols
Deaths of: 
Elvis Presley
Bing Crosby
Marc Bolan
Charles Strouse and Martin Charnin's musical Annie first performed
Fleetwood Mac releases Rumours
Queen – News of the World
Bee Gees – Saturday Night Fever
Kraftwerk's Trans-Europe Express
Television – Marquee Moon
David Bowie – Low and Heroes
Pink Floyd – Animals
Earth, Wind & Fire – All 'n All
Electric Light Orchestra – Out of the Blue
Giorgio Moroder – From Here to Eternity
Taeko Onuki – Sunshower
Motörhead – Motorhead
Space – Magic Fly
Ashra – New Age of Earth
Weather Report – Heavy Weather
Meat Loaf release their debut album Bat Out of Hell
Lynyrd Skynyrd Convair 240 plane crash
Steve Hackett leaves Genesis
Birth of Gerard Way from My Chemical Romance
Birth of Mike Shinoda of Linkin Park and Fort Minor
 1976 in music, 1976 in British music, 1976 in Norwegian musicBirths of:
Chester Bennington
Emma Bunton
Deaths of:
Benjamin Britten
Paul Robeson
Phil Ochs
Howlin' Wolf
Notable releases:
 David Bowie – Station to Station
 Stevie Wonder – Songs in the Key of Life
 Rush – 2112
 Led Zeppelin – Presence
 Bob Dylan – Desire
 Rainbow – Rising
 Judas Priest – Sad Wings of Destiny
 Electric Light Orchestra – A New World Record
 Camel – Moonmadness
 Queen – A Day at the Races
 Kiss – Destroyed
 AC/DC – High Voltage and Dirty Deeds Done Dirt Cheap
 ABBA – Arrival
 Genesis – A Trick of the Tail
 The Eagles – Hotel California
 Andrew Lloyd Webber's Evita concept album
 Jean-Michel Jarre – "Oxygène"
 Mort Garson – "Mother Earth's Plantasia"
 Ryo Fukui – "Scenery"
 ABBA – "Dancing Queen"
Debuts by:
Boston (self-titled)
The Ramones (self-titled)
The Modern Lovers (self-titled)
The Band performs their final concert, The Last Waltz
Russian-soviet baritone Eduard Khil releases the song "I'm So Glad, as I'm Finally Returning Home", which in three decades time, would become an internet sensation on YouTube
 1975 in music, 1975 in British music, 1975 in Norwegian musicDeaths of
Dmitri Shostakovich
Tim Buckley
Umm Kulthum
Bob Dylan begins Rolling Thunder Revue
Bruce Springsteen – Born to Run
Brian Eno – Another Green World
Bruce Springsteen – Born to Run
Black Sabbath – Sabotage
David Bowie – Young Americans
Neil Young – Tonight's the Night
Neu! – Neu! '75
Fela Ransome Kuti & Africa 70 – Expensive Shit
Neil Young and Crazy Horse – Zuma
Parliament – Mothership Connection
Kraftwerk – Radio-Activity
Fleetwood Mac – Fleetwood Mac
Camel – The Snow Goose
Bob Dylan – Blood on the Tracks
Led Zeppelin – Physical Graffiti
Pink Floyd – Wish You Were Here
Aerosmith – Toys in the Attic
Henry Cow and Slapp Happy – In Praise of Learning
Marvin Hamlisch's A Chorus Line
Patti Smith – Horses
Release of Donna Summer's Love to Love You Baby
Peter Gabriel leaves Genesis
Queen releases A Night at the Opera
Birth of Melanie Brown
 1974 in music, 1974 in British music, 1974 in Norwegian musicDeaths of:
Duke Ellington
Nick Drake
Births of: 
Melanie C
Victoria Beckham
Notable releases:
Genesis' The Lamb Lies Down on Broadway
David Bowie's Diamond Dogs
Camel's Mirage
Neil Young's On the Beach
Brian Eno's Here Come the Warm Jets and Taking Tiger Mountain (By Strategy)
Robert Wyatt's Rock Bottom
Genesis' The Lamb Lies Down on Broadway
Frank Zappa's Apostrophe (')
Electric Light Orchestra – Eldorado
Queen's Queen II, Sheer Heart Attack
Yes' Relayer
Sparks' Kimono My House
Supertramp's Crime of the Century
Steely Dan's Pretzel Logic
Joni Mitchell's Court and Spark
Big Star's Radio City
Jorge Ben's A Tábua de Esmeralda
Kraftwerk's Autobahn
King Crimson's Red and Starless and Bible Black
John Coltrane's Interstellar Space
Cluster's Zuckerzeit
Henry Cow's Unrest
Tangerine Dream's Phaedra
Isao Tomita's Snowflakes Are Dancing
Debut of Kiss
ABBA win the 1974 Eurovision Song Contest with Waterloo, Olivia Newton-John places fourth with Long Live Love.
 1973 in music, 1973 in British music, 1973 in Norwegian music –
Deaths of: 
Bobby Darin
Gram Parsons
Births of:
Ferry Corsten
Pink Floyd releases The Dark Side of the Moon
Led Zeppelin release Houses of the Holy
The Who's Quadrophenia Released
Buffalo releases Volcanic Rock
Diana Ross released Touch Me in the Morning
David Bowie releases Aladdin Sane
Richard O'Brien's musical The Rocky Horror Show first performed
Elton John releases Don't Shoot Me I'm Only the Piano Player and Goodbye Yellow Brick Road
Lou Reed release Berlin
Stevie Wonder releases Innervisions
Can releases Future Days
Genesis release Selling England by the Pound
The Stooges release Raw Power
Black Sabbath release Sabbath Bloody Sabbath
John Cale release Paris 1919
Queen release their self-titled debut album
Camel release their self-titled debut album
Steely Dan release Countdown to Ecstasy
Maureen McGovern releases The Morning After
Roberta Flack releases Killing Me Softly With His Song
Marie Osmond releases Paper Roses
Mike Oldfield releases Tubular Bells
King Crimson releases Larks' Tongues in Aspic
Herbie Hancock releases Head Hunters and Sextant
Brian Eno and Robert Fripp release (No Pussyfooting)
Mahavishnu Orchestra release Birds of Fire
Gal Costa releases Índia
Magma releases Mekanïk Destruktïw Kommandöh
Area releases Arbeit macht frei
Faust releases Faust IV
Haruomi Hosono releases Hosono House
 1972 in music, 1972 in British music, 1972 in Norwegian music –
Births of:
The Notorious B.I.G.,
Rob Thomas from Matchbox Twenty;
Eminem
Geri Halliwell
Billie Joe Armstrong
Mike Dirnt
Tré Cool
Mark Hoppus
The Rolling Stones – Exile on Main St.
Elton John – Honky Château
David Bowie – The Rise and Fall of Ziggy Stardust and the Spiders from Mars 
Can – Ege Bamyası
Premiata Forneria Marconi – Per un amico
Debuts by:
Bette Midler (The Divine Miss M)
Neu! (Neu!)
Big Star (#1 Record)
Steely Dan (Can't Buy a Thrill)
 1971 in music, 1971 in British music, 1971 in Norwegian musicBirths of: 
Tupac Shakur
Snoop Dogg
Deaths of: 
Igor Stravinsky
Duane Allman
Louis Armstrong
Jim Morrison
Carl Ruggles
Notable releases:
Led Zeppelin – Led Zeppelin IV
David Bowie – Hunky Dory
Marvin Gaye – What's Going On
The Who – Who's Next
Elton John – Madman Across the Water
Pink Floyd – Meddle
Joni Mitchell – Blue
Can – Tago Mago
Serge Gainsbourg – Histoire de Melody Nelson
Flower Travellin' Band – Satori
Birth of the band Queen
 1970 in music, 1970 in British music, 1970 in Norwegian musicThe Beatles disband
Deaths of: 
Jimi Hendrix
Janis Joplin
Led Zeppelin release Led Zeppelin III
John Lennon releases John Lennon/Plastic Ono Band
Diana Ross departs from The Supremes and releases Ain't No Mountain High Enough
Andrew Lloyd Webber and Tim Rice release a concept album of their debut musical Jesus Christ Superstar (which gives birth to the musical name "rock opera")
Elton John releases his self-titled album
Miles Davis releases Bitches Brew
The Jackson 5 releases ABC
Soft Machine releases Third
Black Sabbath releases Paranoid
George Harrison releases All Things Must Pass
Pink Floyd releases Atom Heart Mother

 1960s 

 1969 in music, 1969 in British music, 1969 in Norwegian music Death of Brian Jones and Judy Garland
 Woodstock music festival held in Bethel, New York
 Birth of Dave Grohl, Marilyn Manson, Mariah Carey, Jennifer Lopez, Jenni Rivera and Tiësto
 Notable releases:
 The Beatles – Abbey Road and Yellow Submarine, the soundtrack album to their 1968 animated film of the same name.
 Bob Dylan – Nashville Skyline
 Frank Zappa – Hot Rats
 David Bowie – Space Oddity
 The Who's Tommy
 King Crimson – In the Court of the Crimson King
 Led Zeppelin – Led Zeppelin and Led Zeppelin II
 Nick Drake – Five Leaves Left
 Pink Floyd – Ummagumma and More
 The Magic Band – Trout Mask Replica
 The Velvet Underground – The Velvet Underground
 Santana – Santana
 Miles Davis – In a Silent Way and Filles de Kilimanjaro
 The Rolling Stones – Let It Bleed
 The Stooges – The Stooges
 Neil Young and the Crazy Horse – Everybody Knows This Is Nowhere
 The Kinks – Arthur (Or the Decline and Fall of the British Empire)
 Pharoah Sanders – Karma
 Scott Walker – Scott 4
 Moondog – Moondog
 Creedence Clearwater Revival – Green River and Willy and the Poor Boys
 The Doors – The Soft Parade
 Sun Ra – Atlantis
 MC5 – Kick Out the Jams
 Sly and the Family Stone – Stand!
 Terry Riley – A Rainbow in Curved Air
 White Noise – An Electric Storm
 Silver Apples – Contact
 Can – Monster Movie
 Amon Düül II – Phallus Dei
 Serge Gainsbourg and Jane Birkin – Jane Birkin/Serge Gainsbourg
 The Archies – Sugar, Sugar
 Jackson 5 appearance on Ed Sullivan
 1968 in music, 1968 in British music, 1968 in Norwegian music Birth of Toni Braxton, John Ondrasik (Five for Fighting) and Thom Yorke
 Van Morrison – Astral Weeks
 Sammy Davis Jr. – I've Gotta Be Me
 The Rolling Stones – Beggars Banquet
 The Jimi Hendrix Experience – Electric Ladyland
 The Beatles – The Beatles (AKA The White Album)
 Johnny Cash – At Folsom Prison
 The Band – Music from Big Pink
 Anne Murray – What About Me
 The Mothers of Invention – We're Only in It for the Money
 Silver Apples – Silver Apples
 The United States of America – The United States of America
 The Velvet Underground – White Light/White Heat
 Pink Floyd – A Saucerful of Secrets
 The Zombies – Odessey and Oracle
 The Kinks – The Kinks Are the Village Green Preservation Society
 The Doors – Waiting for the Sun
 Nico – The Marble Index
 Cream – Wheels of Fire
 Soft Machine – The Soft Machine
 The Byrds – The Notorious Byrd Brothers
 Gábor Szabó – Dreams
 Os Mutantes – Os Mutantes
 Peter Brötzmann – Machine Gun
 1967 in music, 1967 in British music, 1967 in Norwegian music Birth of Kurt Cobain, Chuck Schuldiner
 Death of Woody Guthrie, John Coltrane, Otis Redding;
 The Beatles – Sgt. Pepper's Lonely Hearts Club Band and Magical Mystery Tour
 The Velvet Underground – The Velvet Underground & Nico
 Red Krayola – The Parable of Arable Land
 The Jimi Hendrix Experience – Are You Experienced and Axis: Bold as Love
 Pink Floyd – The Piper at the Gates of Dawn
 David Bowie the debut album from the British artist of the same name
 Aretha Franklin – I Never Loved a Man the Way I Love You which features her own and iconic version of Respect.
 The Doors – The Doors (with the hit single, "Light My Fire") and Strange Days
 Louis Armstrong – "What a Wonderful World"
 Bob Dylan – John Wesley Harding
 The 13th Floor Elevators – Easter Everywhere
 Love – Forever Changes
 Leonard Cohen – Songs of Leonard Cohen
 Captain Beefheart and his Magic Band – Safe as Milk
 Cream – Disraeli Gears
 Jefferson Airplane – Surrealistic Pillow
 The Who – The Who Sell Out
 The Kinks – Something Else by the Kinks
 Nico – Chelsea Girl
 The Moody Blues with the London Festival Orchestra – Days of Future Passed
 The Beach Boys – Wild Honey and Smiley Smile
 The Rolling Stones – Their Satanic Majesties Request
 The 13th Floor Elevators – Easter Everywhere
 Miles Davis – Miles Smiles
 Antônio Carlos Jobim – Wave
 Red Krayola (with The Familiar Ugly) – The Parable of Arable Land
 Duke Ellington – Far East Suite
 Monterey Pop Festival
 1966 in music, 1966 in British music, 1966 in Norwegian music Birth of Rick Astley
 The Beach Boys – Pet Sounds
 Cream – Fresh Cream
 The Beatles – Yesterday and Today and Revolver
 Bob Dylan – Blonde on Blonde
 The 13th Floor Elevators – The Psychedelic Sounds of the 13th Floor Elevators
 The Mothers of Invention – Freak Out!
 The Rolling Stones – Aftermath
 The 13th Floor Elevators – The Psychedelic Sounds of the 13th Floor Elevators
 Simon & Garfunkel – Sounds of Silence
 The Kinks – Face to Face
 Simon & Garfunkel – Parsley, Sage, Rosemary and Thyme
 The Monks – Black Monk Time
 Love – Da Capo
 The Byrds – Fifth Dimension
 Cream – Fresh Cream
 The Who – A Quick One
 Donovan – Sunshine Superman
 The Yardbirds – Roger the Engineer
 Them – Them Again
 Buffalo Springfield – Buffalo Springfield
 Nina Simone – Wild Is the Wind
 John Mayall & the Bluesbreakers – Blues Breakers with Eric Clapton
 The Mamas & the Papas – If You Can Believe Your Eyes and Ears
 John Coltrane – Ascension and Meditations
 Ennio Morricone – soundtrack album to the 1966 Italian western film The Good, the Bad and the Ugly
 Herbie Hancock – Maidene Voyage
 Wayne Shorter – Speak No Evil
 Krzysztof Komeda – Astigmatic
 Larry Young – Unity
 1965 in music, 1965 in British music, 1965 in Norwegian music The Beatles – Help! and Rubber Soul
 Bob Dylan – Bringing It All Back Home and Highway 61 Revisited (with the single "Like a Rolling Stone")
 Dale Wasserman – Man of La Mancha first performed
 The Rolling Stones – Out of Our Heads (with the single "(I Can't Get No) Satisfaction")
 Tom Jones – "What's New Pussycat?" (from the film of the same name)
 James Brown – "I Got You (I Feel Good)"
 Otis Redding – Otis Blue/Otis Redding Sings Soul (featuring the first version of Respect)
 The Who – My Generation
 The Beach Boys – The Beach Boys Today!, Summer Days (And Summer Nights!!) and Beach Boys' Party!
 Nina Simone – Pastel Blues and I Put a Spell on You
 The Byrds – Mr. Tambourine Man and Turn! Turn! Turn!
 The Sonics – Here Are The Sonics
 Jackson C. Frank – Jackson C. Frank
 The Yardbirds – Having a Rave Up with the Yardbirds
 Martha and the Vandellas – Dance Party
 Cher – All I Really Want to Do
 The Shangri-Las – Leader of the Pack
 John Coltrane – A Love Supreme
 Vince Guaraldi – A Charlie Brown Christmas the soundtrack album to the Peanuts animated television special of the same name.
 Herb Alpert and the Tijuana Brass – Going Places
 Albert Ayler – Spiritual Unity
 Grant Green – Idle Moments
 Andrew Hill – Point of Departure
 Bobby Hutcherson – Dialogue
 Herman's Hermits debut
 Death of Edgard Varèse, Nat King Cole.
 1964 in music, 1964 in British music, 1964 in Norwegian music Birth of Robert Trujillo – Death of Sam Cooke, Milton Babbitt, Ensembles For Synthesizer
 The Beatles appear on The Ed Sullivan Show
 The Beatles – A Hard Day's Night and Beatles for Sale
 Stan Getz and João Gilberto – Getz/Gilberto
 The Ronettes – Presenting the Fabulous Ronettes Featuring Veronica
 Eric Dolphy – Out to Lunch!
 Bob Dylan – The Times They Are a-Changin' and Another Side of Bob Dylan
 The Beach Boys – All Summer Long (featuring the No. 1. hit I Get Around)
 The Rolling Stones – The Rolling Stones and 12 x 5
 Charles Mingus – Mingus Mingus Mingus Mingus Mingus
 Herbie Hancock – Empyrean Isles
 Lee Morgan – The Sidewinder
 Kinks – The Kinks
 John Coltrane – Crescent
 Simon & Garfunkel – Wednesday Morning, 3 A.M.
 Yusef Lateef – Eastern Sounds
 Muddy Waters – Folk Singer
 Andrew Hill – Black Fire
 The Supremes – Where Did Our Love Go
 Sam Cooke – Ain't That Good News
 Dusty Springfield – A Girl Called Dusty
 Bill Lear invents 8-track tape cartridge
 British Invasion begins, Beatlemania invades America and becomes international, The Righteous Brothers become the first white act signed to Phil Spector's Philles label.
 1963 in music, 1963 in British music, 1963 in Norwegian music First cassette tapes made by Philips
 Birth of Paul Oakenfold, Whitney Houston, George Michael, Eazy-E and James Hetfield
 Death of Patsy Cline and Édith Piaf
 The Beatles – Please Please Me and With the Beatles
 Charles Mingus – The Black Saint and the Sinner Lady
 Bob Dylan – The Freewheelin' Bob Dylan
 James Brown and The Famous Flames – Live at the Apollo
 The Righteous Brothers – Little Latin Lupe Lu is released on the Moonglow label
 Duke Ellington, Charles Mingus and Max Roach – Money Jungle
 Thelonious Monk – Monk's Dream
 Duke Ellington and John Coltrane – Duke Ellington & John Coltrane
 Jorge Ben – Samba Esquema Novo
 The Beach Boys – Surfin' U.S.A., Surfer Girl and Little Deuce Coupe
 John Coltrane – Ballads
 A Christmas Gift for You from Phil Spector a collection of Christmas songs is released on Philles Records
 John Coltrane and Johnny Hartman – John Coltrane and Johnny Hartman
 Sam Cooke – Night Beat
 Kenny Burrell – Midnight Blue
 Gerry Mulligan – Night Lights
 Stan Getz and Luiz Bonfá – Jazz Samba Encore!
 Marvin Gaye – That Stubborn Kinda Fellow
 Stevie Wonder releases his first big hit 'finger-tips – part 2' aged only 13, arguably making Motown music commercially popular for the first time even though its birth was in 1959
 Elvis Presley records Today, Tomorrow and Forever with Ann-Margret, which uses the melody of Franz Liszt's Liebesträume.
 1962 in music, 1962 in British music, 1962 in Norwegian music Charles Mingus – Tijuana Moods and Oh Yeah
 The Beach Boys – Surfin' Safari
 Bill Evans and Jim Hall – Undercurrent
 John Coltrane – Coltrane
 Dexter Gordon – Go
 Françoise Hardy – Tous les garçons et les filles
 Stan Getz and Charlie Byrd – Jazz Samba
 Booker T. & the M.G.'s – Green Onions
 Herbie Hancock – Takin' Off
 Ray Charles – Modern Sounds in Country and Western Music
 Bill Evans Trio – Waltz for Debby
 Duke Ellington, Charles Mingus and Max Roach – Money Jungle
 Bob Dylan is the debut album from the highly influential American artist of the same name. It was released on March 19, 1962, on Columbia Records, when Dylan was 20 years old.
 Arrival of The Beatles
 Birth of Anthony Kiedis, Flea, Jon Bon Jovi, Axl Rose
 Death of Marilyn Monroe
 1961 in music, 1961 in British music, 1961 in Norwegian music John Coltrane – My Favorite Things and Olé Coltrane
 Ornette Coleman – Free Jazz: A Collective Improvisation
 John Coltrane – Africa/Brass
 Max Roach – We Insist!
 Oliver Nelson – The Blues and the Abstract Truth
 Eric Dolphy – Out There
 Thelonious Monk – Thelonious Monk with John Coltrane
 Birth of Dave Mustaine, Tom Araya, Roland Orzabal and Curt Smith
 Death of Cisco Houston and Moss Hart
 1960 in music, 1960 in British music, 1960 in Norwegian music John Coltrane's Giant Steps
 Miles Davis' Sketches of Spain
 Charles Mingus' Blues & Roots and Mingus Dynasty
 Bill Evans' Portrait in Jazz
 Joan Baez's self-titled debut album
 Etta James' At Last!
 Wes Montgomery's The Incredible Jazz Guitar of Wes Montgomery
 Hank Mobley's Soul Station
 Lionel Bart's Oliver!
 Ornette Coleman's Change of the Century
 João Gilberto's O Amor, o Sorriso e a Flor
 Tina Brooks' True Blue
 Birth of Bono
 Death of Oscar Hammerstein II

 1950s 1959 in music, 1959 in British music, 1959 in Norwegian music Births of Sheena Easton, Irene Cara, "Weird Al" Yankovic, Pete Burns (from Dead or Alive), and Marie Osmond.
 Deaths of Billie Holiday, Ritchie Valens, Buddy Holly, the Big Bopper, and Heitor Villa-Lobos.
 Motown Records is founded, with their first hit being Barrett Strong's "Money (That's What I Want)".
 Jule Styne and Stephen Sondheim's musical Gypsy first performed
 Notable releases:
 Miles Davis – Kind of Blue, Porgy and Bess and Workin' with the Miles Davis Quintet
 Charles Mingus – Mingus Ah Um
 The Dave Brubeck Quartet – Time Out
 Ornette Coleman – The Shape of Jazz to Come
 Art Blakey and The Jazz Messengers – Moanin'
 Marty Robbins – Gunfighter Ballads and Trail Songs
 João Gilberto – Chega de Saudade
 Odetta – My Eyes Have Seen
 Sun Ra and his Arkestra – Jazz in Silhouette
 Nina Simone – Little Girl Blue
 Bill Evans – Everybody Digs Bill Evans
 John Fahey – Blind Joe Death
 Chuck Berry – Chuck Berry Is on Top
 Dizzy Gillespie, Sonny Stitt and Sonny Rollins – Sonny Side Up
 Ray Charles – The Genius of Ray Charles
 Chet Baker – Chet
 Enoch Light and his Orchestra – Persuasive Percussion
 Frank Sinatra – Come Dance with Me!
 Horace Silver – Blowin' the Blues Away
 Bobby Darin's "Mack the Knife", a No. 1 hit for nine weeks
 Rodgers and Hammerstein – The Sound of Music.
 1st Grammy Awards are awarded1958 in music, 1958 in British music, 1958 in Norwegian music Death of Ralph Vaughan Williams
 Alvin and the Chipmunks release "The Chipmunk Song (Christmas Don't Be Late)"
 Birth of Bruce Dickinson, Nikki Sixx, Prince, Madonna, Michael Jackson and Fernando de la Mora
 Bossa Nova a Brazilian kind of music.
 Carl Ruggles, Exaltation in honour of his late wife, Charlotte.
 Cliff Richard and The Drifters release Move It, considered Britain's first rock and roll hit single.
 Little Richard enters seminary
 Notable releases:
 Cannonball Adderley's Somethin' Else
 Art Blakey and the Jazz Messengers, Moanin'
 Count Basie and his orchestra's The Atomic Mr. Basie
 John Coltrane's Blue Train
 Frank Sinatra's Frank Sinatra Sings for Only the Lonely
 Billie Holiday's Lady in Satin
 Frank Sinatra's Come Fly with Me
 Ella Fitzgerald's Ella Fitzgerald Sings the Irving Berlin Song Book
 Miles Davis' Milestones, Ascenseur pour l'échafaud and Relaxin' with the Miles Davis Quintet
 Buddy Holly's Buddy Holly1957 in music, 1957 in British music, 1957 in Norwegian music Death of Jean Sibelius
 Birth of Anita Ward
 "That'll Be the Day" by Buddy Holly and The Crickets becomes a US No. 1 hit
 Arthur Laurents's (book), Leonard Bernstein's (music), and Stephen Sondheim's (lyrics) musical West Side Story first performed
 Harry Belafonte has a big hit that reached number five on the Billboard charts with the calypso song "Day-O"
 At the Gate of Horn is the second solo album by American folk singer Odetta who was a seminal influence on the folksingers of the 1960s
 John Lennon and Paul McCartney meet in Liverpool
 Notable releases:
 Sonny Rollins' Saxophone Colossus
 Miles Davis' Miles Ahead, 'Round About Midnight and Cookin' with the Miles Davis Quintet
 Thelonious Monk's Brilliant Corners and Monk's Music
 Charles Mingus' The Clown
 Little Richard's Here's Little Richard
 Johnny Cash's Johnny Cash with His Hot and Blue Guitar!
 The Crickets' The "Chirping" Crickets
 Chuck Berry's After School Session
 Sonny Rollins' Way Out West
 Elvis Presley' Elvis' Christmas Album1956 in music, 1956 in British music, 1956 in Norwegian music – The first Eurovision Song Contest is held on 24 May, Elvis Presley appears on The Ed Sullivan Show; Leonard Bernstein's opretta Candide first performed; Odetta Sings Ballads and Blues is the influential debut solo album by American folk singer Odetta; Elvis Presley's self-titled debut album1955 in music, 1955 in British music, 1955 in Norwegian music – Cole Porter's Silk Stockings; Deaths of George Enescu and Charlie Parker; "Rock Around the Clock" becomes first worldwide No. 1 rock and roll record; Little Richard records "Tutti-Frutti", one of the first rock and roll songs; Birth of Yo-Yo Ma, Harry James signs with Capitol releasing Harry James in Hi-Fi, Lonnie Donegan released "Rock Island Line".1954 in music, 1954 in British music, 1954 in Norwegian music –
Death of Billy Murray, Birth of Jaramar
Elvis Presley's debut single, "That's All Right", is released on Sun Records
First Fender Stratocaster produced
The British musical Salad Days by Julian Slade and Dorothy Reynolds first performed1953 in music, 1953 in British music, 1953 in Norwegian music – Cole Porter's Can-Can; Death of Hank Williams, Death of Sergei Prokofiev, Soviet composer and pianist1952 in music, 1952 in British music, 1952 in Norwegian music – Birth of Joe Strummer, Johnny Thunders, The official UK singles chart is launched; Recording Industry Association of America (or RIAA) established1951 in music, 1951 in British music, 1951 in Norwegian music – "Rocket 88" is recorded by Ike Turner and hailed as the first rock 'n' roll song; The Rake's Progress by Igor Stravinsky premieres in Venice. Birth of Joey Ramone; The King and I by Rodgers and Hammerstein; death of Arnold Schoenberg1950 in music, 1950 in British music, 1950 in Norwegian music – Births of Stevie Wonder, Tom Petty, Agnetha Fältskog; Cartoon voice actor Mel Blanc releases the song "I Tawt I Taw a Puddy Tat" as Looney Tunes characters Tweety and Sylvester; Deaths of Kurt Weill, Al Jolson, Vaslav Nijinsky

 1940s 

 1949 in music, 1949 in British music, 1949 in Norwegian music – Birth of Bruce Springsteen, Maureen McGovern, Valery Leontiev, Paul Rodgers, Billy Joel, Steve Perry, Rick Springfield, Gene Simmons, Lionel Richie, Roger Taylor and Mark Knopfler; RCA Victor introduces 45 RPM records; South Pacific by Rodgers and Hammerstein Death of Richard Strauss German composer
 1948 in music, 1948 in British music, 1948 in Norwegian music – Birth of Robert Plant, John Bonham, Steven Tyler, Donna Summer, Johnny Ramone, Ted Nugent, Andrew Lloyd Webber, James Taylor, Alice Cooper, Jackson Browne, Kenny Loggins, Ian Paice, Olivia Newton-John, Stevie Nicks, and Ozzy Osbourne; Kiss Me, Kate – Cole Porter; Four Last Songs – Richard Strauss; Columbia Records introduces 331/3 RPM (LP) records.
 1947 in music, 1947 in British music, 1947 in Norwegian music – Birth of Elton John, David Bowie, Bob Weir, Brian Johnson, Emmylou Harris, Arlo Guthrie, Tracy Nelson, Paul Brady, Tim Buckley, Jim Messina, Mick Fleetwood, Organum, Jeff Lynne and Carlos Santana
 1946 in music, 1946 in British music, 1946 in Norwegian music – Birth of Freddie Mercury, Toquinho, Keith Moon, Benny Andersson, Bon Scott, Donovan, Linda Ronstadt, Marianne Faithfull, Gram Parsons, Cher, Patti Smith, David Gilmour, John Paul Jones and Dolly Parton
 1945 in music, 1945 in British music, 1945 in Norwegian music – Birth of Bob Marley, Pete Townshend, Neil Young, Van Morrison, Bob Seger, Bob Welch, Bette Midler, Deborah Harry, Anne Murray, Carly Simon, John Fogerty, Rod Stewart, Kim Carnes, Davy Jones, Micky Dolenz, Anni-Frid Lyngstad, Björn Ulvaeus, John McVie, Ian Gillan, Roger Glover, Ritchie Blackmore, Itzhak Perlman, Debbie Harry and Eric Clapton; Death of Jerome Kern; Peter Grimes by Benjamin Britten premieres in London; Carousel – Rodgers and Hammerstein; Metamorphosen by Richard Strauss; 
 1944 in music, 1944 in British music, 1944 in Norwegian music – Birth of Keith Emerson, Barry White, Diana Ross, Jeff Beck, Chico Buarque, Marvin Hamlisch, Roger Daltrey, John Entwistle, Booker T. Jones, Joe Cocker, Patti LaBelle, Gladys Knight, Gary Glitter, Brenda Lee, Townes Van Zandt, Mary Wilson (singer) and Jimmy Page; Disappearance of Glenn Miller,
 1943 in music, 1943 in British music, 1943 in Norwegian music – Birth of Mick Jagger, Keith Richards, Jim Morrison, George Harrison, Janis Joplin, Joni Mitchell, Robbie Robertson, Richard Manuel, John Denver, Jack Bruce, Barry Manilow, Christine McVie, Jim Croce, Carlos, Gavin Bryars, Bobby Sherman, Roger Waters and Richard Wright; Death of Lorenz Hart, Sergei Rachmaninoff, Formation of Rodgers and Hammerstein, Carl Ruggles, Evocations; The original Broadway production of Oklahoma! opened on March 31, 1943, at the St. James Theatre in New York City.
 1942 in music, 1942 in British music, 1942 in Norwegian music – Birth of Paul McCartney, Jimi Hendrix, Brian Jones, John P. Hammond, Ronnie James Dio, Brian Wilson, Jerry Garcia, Peter Tork, Michael Nesmith, Aretha Franklin, Barbra Streisand, Carole King, Rick Danko, Lou Reed, Paul Butterfield, Jerry Jeff Walker and Tammy Wynette; Death of George M. Cohan
 1941 in music, 1941 in British music, 1941 in Norwegian music – Birth of Bob Dylan, Joan Baez, Paul Simon, Art Garfunkel, Hank Marvin, Otis Redding, Jon Lord, Chubby Checker, Aaron Neville, Charlie Watts, Neil Diamond, Richie Havens, Cass Elliot, Wilson Pickett, Linda McCartney and Ritchie Valens; Les Paul builds one of the first solid-body electric guitars;
 1940 in music, 1940 in British music, 1940 in Norwegian music – Birth of John Lennon, Ringo Starr, Frank Zappa, Tom Jones, Vicente Fernández, Dionne Warwick, Cliff Richard, Phil Ochs, Levon Helm, Nancy Sinatra, Denny Doherty, Smokey Robinson, Ricky Nelson, Tim Hardin, Dionne Warwick, Bobby Hatfield, Bill Medley and (both of the Righteous Brothers)

 1930s 
 1939 in music, 1939 in British music, 1939 in Norwegian music – Birth of Judy Collins, Marvin Gaye, Ray Manzarek, Ginger Baker, Tina Turner and Grace Slick; Cole Porter's DuBarry Was a Lady; Judy Garland records "Over the Rainbow"
 1938 in music, 1938 in British music, 1938 in Norwegian music – Birth of Peter Yarrow, Gordon Lightfoot, Ben E. King, Death of Robert Johnson, Benny Goodman presents a jazz concert in Carnegie Hall; Death of Dan W. Quinn
 1937 in music, 1937 in British music, 1937 in Norwegian music – Death of George Gershwin, Birth of Roberta Flack, Waylon Jennings, Merle Haggard, Garth Hudson, Tom Paxton, Philip Glass, Dame Shirley Bassey, Carl Orff's Carmina Burana premieres
 1936 in music, 1936 in British music, 1936 in Norwegian music – Birth of Buddy Holly, Roy Orbison, Kris Kristofferson, Bill Wyman, Dave Van Ronk, Steve Reich, Bobby Darin, Billboard publishes first U.S. music chart
 1935 in music, 1935 in British music, 1935 in Norwegian music – Birth of Elvis Presley, Jerry Lee Lewis, Gene Vincent, Luciano Pavarotti, Ronnie Hawkins, Johnnie Mathis, John Phillips, Lou Rawls, La Monte Young, Terry Riley; Audiovox produce first electric bass guitar; Porgy and Bess by George Gershwin premieres in New York
 1934 in music, 1934 in British music, 1934 in Norwegian music – Cole Porter's Anything Goes; Birth of Leonard Cohen, Jackie Wilson; Tammy Grimes, Bob Shane, King Curtis, Florence Henderson, Renata Scotto, Shirley Jones, Otis Rush, Frankie Valli, Pat Boone, André Prévost, Freddie King, Brian Epstein, Dave Guard, Del Shannon; Deaths of Edward Elgar and Gustav Holst
 1933 in music, 1933 in British music, 1933 in Norwegian music – Birth of James Brown, Quincy Jones, Willie Nelson, Nina Simone, Yoko Ono, Nick Reynolds
 1932 in music, 1932 in British music, 1932 in Norwegian music – Night and Day by Cole Porter; Birth of Johnny Cash, Petula Clark, Patsy Cline, Glenn Gould, Loretta Lynn, Miriam Makeba Carl Perkins, Little Richard, and John Williams; Death of John Philip Sousa; Adolph Rickenbacker produces first electric guitar; Bell Labs creates first stereophonic sound recordings
 1931 in music, 1931 in British music, 1931 in Norwegian music – Birth of Teresa Brewer, Sam Cooke, João Gilberto, George Jones and Phyllis McGuire; Death of Anna Pavlova
 1930 in music, 1930 in British music, 1930 in Norwegian music – Birth of Ray Charles, Herbie Mann, Odetta, Sonny Rollins, Stephen Sondheim, and The Big Bopper

 1920s 
 1929 in music, 1929 in British music, 1929 in Norwegian music – Cole Porter's Fifty Million Frenchmen; Birth of Beverly Sills, Bill Evans, Dick Clark, Berry Gordy, Henri Pousseur
 1928 in music, 1928 in British music, 1928 in Norwegian music – Birth of Bo Diddley and Karlheinz Stockhausen; Fats Domino The Threepenny Opera by Kurt Weill and Bertolt Brecht (libretto) premieres in Berlin
 1927 in music, 1927 in British music, 1927 in Norwegian music – Jerome Kern's Show Boat; Igor Stravinsky's Apollo; Birth of Harry Belafonte, Antônio Carlos Jobim, Patti Page, Ralph Stanley
 1926 in music, 1926 in British music, 1926 in Norwegian music – Tapiola by Jean Sibelius; Birth of Marilyn Monroe, Joan Sutherland, John Coltrane, Miles Davis, Chuck Berry, Tony Bennett, Big Mama Thornton; Turandot by Giacomo Puccini premieres in Milan
 1925 in music, 1925 in British music, 1925 in Norwegian music – Birth of Celia Cruz, B.B. King and Pierre Boulez; Big record labels begin using electric microphones for recording; 78 RPM adopted as standard for records; BBC makes first radio broadcast in stereo; Wozzeck by Alban Berg premieres in Berlin, Carl Ruggles, Portals. Debut of the Grand Ole Opry.
 1924 in music, 1924 in British music, 1924 in Norwegian music – Gershwin's Rhapsody in Blue premieres in New York; the Symphony No. 7 by Jean Sibelius; Death of Giacomo Antonio Domenico Michele Secondo Maria Puccini, Italian opera composer, Carl Ruggles. Men and Mountains. Debut of the National Barn Dance, the first radio program devoted to country music.
 1923 in music, 1923 in British music, 1923 in Norwegian music – Birth of Hank Williams, First recordings by Louis Armstrong, Bessie Smith, and many other African-American artists, Carl Ruggles, Vox clamans in deserto
 1922 in music, 1922 in British music, 1922 in Norwegian music – Birth of Judy Garland.
 1921 in music, 1921 in British music, 1921 in Norwegian music – Death of Enrico Caruso, Carl Ruggles Angels
 1920 in music, 1920 in British music, 1920 in Norwegian music – Birth of Charlie Parker, Ravi Shankar, Isaac Stern; Death of Alberto Nepomuceno, Brazilian composer, pianist, organist and conductor.

 1910s 
 1919 in music, 1919 in British music, 1919 in Norwegian music – Birth of Pete Seeger, Merce Cunningham, Carl Ruggles, Toys
 1918 in music, 1918 in British music, 1918 in Norwegian music – Phonograph cylinders become obsolete; the Society for Private Musical Performances is founded in Vienna by Arnold Schoenberg; Death of Claude Debussy
 1917 in music, 1917 in British music, 1917 in Norwegian music – Birth of Lou Harrison, Ella Fitzgerald, John Lee Hooker, Dinu Lipatti, Isang Yun; First hit jazz recordings by Original Dixieland Jass Band, Death of Scott Joplin
 1916 in music, 1916 in British music, 1916 in Norwegian music – Birth of Milton Babbitt, Henri Dutilleux, Alberto Ginastera, Betty Grable, Harry James, Dinah Shore,
 1915 in music, 1915 in British music, 1915 in Norwegian music – An Alpine Symphony by Richard Strauss; Birth of Billie Holiday, Frank Sinatra, John Serry, Sr.; Tom Brown starts billing his group as a "Jass Band"
 1914 in music, 1914 in British music, 1914 in Norwegian music – "St. Louis Blues" published; first calypso music recordings
 1913 in music, 1913 in British music, 1913 in Norwegian music – Birth of Muddy Waters, Vinicius de Moraes, Benjamin Britten English Composer; Igor Stravinsky's The Rite of Spring is premiered in Paris. Birth of 
 1912 in music, 1912 in British music, 1912 in Norwegian music – Birth of Woody Guthrie, Lightnin' Hopkins, John Cage
 1911 in music, 1911 in British music, 1911 in Norwegian music – Birth of Robert Johnson, Der Rosenkavalier by Richard Strauss premieres in Dresden, Death of Gustav Mahler, Austrian composer and conductor
 1910 in music, 1910 in British music, 1910 in Norwegian music – Birth of Howlin' Wolf, Artie Shaw, John H. Hammond, Django Reinhardt; "Let Me Call You Sweetheart"

 1900s 
 1909 in music, 1909 in British music, 1909 in Norwegian music – Death of Francisco Tárrega; Elektra by Richard Strauss premieres in Dresden; Birth of Benny Goodman
 1908 in music, 1908 in British music, 1908 in Norwegian music – The two first atonal pieces are composed, first by Béla Bartók and then by Arnold Schoenberg Death of Nikolai Rimsky-Korsakov.
 1907 in music, 1907 in British music, 1907 in Norwegian music – Death of Edvard Grieg, Norwegian composer (b. 1843); Birth of Gene Autry, Cab Calloway, Benny Carter, Kate Smith
 1906 in music, 1906 in British music, 1906 in Norwegian music – Birth of Dmitri Shostakowich, soviet composer and pianist, Victor begins selling the Victrola phonograph player for $15.00; Len Spencer, I Am The Edison Phonograph --- earliest recorded advert played in Phonograph shops to sell the devices; the Symphony No. 8 by Gustav Mahler: Birth of Pedro Vargas  known as the "Nightingale of the Americas".
 1905 in music, 1905 in British music, 1905 in Norwegian music – The Merry Widow by Franz Lehár premieres in Vienna; Salome by Richard Strauss premieres in Dresden
 1904 in music, 1904 in British music, 1904 in Norwegian music – The Violin Concerto (Sibelius) by Jean Sibelius; Death of Antonín Dvořák, Czech composer, Madama Butterfly by Giacomo Puccini premieres in Milan
 1903 in music, 1903 in British music, 1903 in Norwegian music – Valse triste by Jean Sibelius; Birth of Bing Crosby and Vladimir Horowitz
 1902 in music, 1902 in British music, 1902 in Norwegian music – Birth of Richard Rodgers, Pelléas et Mélisande by Claude Debussy premieres in Paris
 1901 in music, 1901 in British music, 1901 in Norwegian music – Birth of Louis Armstrong, Death of Giuseppe Verdi, Italian composer, Birth of Silvestre Vargas
 1900 in music, 1900 in British music, 1900 in Norwegian music – Tosca by Giacomo Puccini premieres in Rome

 1890s 
 1899 in music, 1899 in Norwegian music – Rusalka by Antonín Dvořák; Ein Heldenleben by Richard Strauss; Symphony No. 1 and publication of Finlandia by Jean Sibelius; Shéhérazade by Maurice Ravel; Enigma Variations by Edward Elgar; "Maple Leaf Rag" by Scott Joplin; Death of Johann Strauss II; Birth of Duke Ellington; Birth of Silvestre Revueltas
 1898 in music, 1898 in Norwegian music – Birth of George Gershwin, Paul Robeson
 1897 in music, 1897 in Norwegian music – Ragtime music becomes popular in the United States; Death of Brahms, Birth of Marian Anderson
 1896 in music, 1896 in Norwegian music – Also sprach Zarathustra by Richard Strauss; Jungfrun i tornet by Jean Sibelius; Death of Carlos Gomes, Brazilian composer and opera composer and Anton Bruckner, Austrian composer and organist
 1895 in music, 1895 in Norwegian music – The Swan of Tuonela by Jean Sibelius; Till Eulenspiegel's Merry Pranks by Richard Strauss; Birth of Carl Orff, Oscar Hammerstein II, William Grant Still, the "Dean of African-American music"
 1894 in music, 1894 in Norwegian music – Cello Concerto and Humoresques by Antonín Dvořák
 1893 in music, 1893 in Norwegian music – Symphony No. 9 and String Quartet No. 12 by Antonín Dvořák; Symphony No. 3 by Gustav Mahler; Karelia Suite by Jean Sibelius; Death of Pyotr Ilyich Tchaikovsky, Russian composer
 1892 in music, 1892 in Norwegian music – Dan W. Quinn makes first recordings in New York City; Kullervo by Jean Sibelius; Pagliacci by Ruggero Leoncavallo; The Nutcracker by Marius Petipa
 1891 in music, 1891 in Norwegian music – Piano Trio No. 4 by Antonín Dvořák; Birth of Sergei Prokofiev, Soviet composer and pianist; George W. Johnson becomes first African American recording artist with "The Laughing Song"
 1890 in music, 1890 in Norwegian music – John Philip Sousa makes first recordings with Columbia Phonograph Company; Birth of Bronislava Nijinska, choreographer

 1880s 
 1889 in music, 1889 in Norwegian music – Effie Stewart records at Menlo Park; Edison starts commercial recordings on May 24; First phonograph parlor opens in San Francisco; Kaiser-Walzer by Johann Strauss II; Death and Transfiguration by Richard Strauss.
 1888 in music, 1888 in Norwegian music – Symphony No. 2 by Gustav Mahler; Birth of Lead Belly; Death of Charles-Valentin Alkan, French composer and pianist; Wax phonograph cylinders commercially marketed; Emile Berliner invents lateral-cut disc records.
 1887 in music, 1887 in Norwegian music – The Havanaise (Saint-Saëns) by Camille Saint-Saëns; Birth of Heitor Villa-Lobos, Brazilian composer, cellist, and guitarist
 1886 in music, 1886 in Norwegian music – The Carnival of the Animals and the Symphony No. 3 by Camille Saint-Saëns; birth of Marcel Dupré, Al Jolson, Paul Paray, Othmar Schoeck; Franz Liszt publishes his final Hungarian Rhapsody; death of Franz Liszt.
 1885 in music, 1885 in Norwegian music – The Mikado – Arthur Sullivan; The Gypsy Baron by Johann Strauss II; Birth of Jerome Kern
 1884 in music, 1884 in Norwegian music – Birth of Sophie Tucker
 1883 in music, 1883 in Norwegian music – Birth of Edgard Varèse, Death of Richard Wagner, German composer
 1882 in music, 1882 in Norwegian music – Birth of Igor Stravinsky, Russian composer, Parsifal by Richard Wagner premieres in Bayreuth; Pyotr Ilyich Tchaikovsky – 1812 Overture premiere
 1881 in music, 1881 in Norwegian music – Births of Béla Bartók and George Enescu
 1880 in music, 1880 in Norwegian music – Stabat Mater and "Songs My Mother Taught Me" by Antonín Dvorák; The Violin Concerto No. 3 (Saint-Saëns) by Camille Saint-Saëns; Death of Jacques Offenbach, composer (b. 1819)

 1870s 
 1879 in music, 1879 in Norwegian music – Birth of Jean Cras
 1878 in music – Birth of George M. Cohan; William S. Gilbert and Arthur Sullivan, H.M.S. Pinafore; reshapes British and American musical theater;
 1877 in music – Phonograph and phonograph cylinder invented by Thomas Alva Edison; Samson and Delilah by Camille Saint-Saëns Birth of Billy Murray (singer)
 1876 in music – Siegfried and Götterdämmerung by Richard Wagner premiere in Bayreuth; Birth of Carl Ruggles
 1875 in music – Birth of Joseph-Maurice Ravel, French composer and pianist; Carmen by Georges Bizet premieres in Paris; Swan Lake by Pyotr Ilyich Tchaikovsky premiers
 1874 in music – Boris Godunov by Modest Mussorgsky premieres in Saint Petersburg; Die Fledermaus by Johann Strauss II premieres in Vienna; Richard Wagner concludes Götterdämmerung, finishing The Ring Cycle; Requiem by Giuseppe Verdi; Danse macabre by Camille Saint-Saëns; Birth of Arnold Schoenberg
 1873 in music – Birth of Enrico Caruso, Sergei Rachmaninoff, Russian composer, ultra virtuoso pianist and conductor
 1872 in music – The Cello Concerto No. 1 (Saint-Saëns) by Camille Saint-Saëns; Birth of Ralph Vaughan Williams, English composer; birth of Sergei Diaghilev, choreographer (d. 1929)
 1871 in music – Richard Wagner concludes Siegfried; Aida by Giuseppe Verdi premieres in Cairo
 1870 in music – Die Walküre (the Valkyrie) by Richard Wagner premieres in Munich

 1860s 
 1869 in music – Death of Hector Berlioz, French composer, Das Rheingold by Richard Wagner premieres in Munich
 1868 in music – Death of Gioachino Rossini, Italian composer, Die Meistersinger von Nürnberg by Richard Wagner premières in Munich; Ein deutsches Requiem by Johannes Brahms premières in Bremen; Wiegenlied by Brahms (Brahms' Lullaby); Tales from the Vienna Woods by Johann Strauss II; the Piano Concerto No. 2 (Saint-Saëns) by Camille Saint-Saëns
 1867 in music Birth of Scott Joplin, famous ragtime composer; The Blue Danube by Johann Strauss II; Roméo et Juliette (opera) by Charles Gounod; Peer Gynt by Edvard Grieg
 1866 in music – Franz Liszt completes his oratorio Christus; Birth of French composer Erik Satie.
 1865 in music – Birth of Finnish composer Jean Sibelius; Tristan und Isolde by Richard Wagner premieres in Munich, marking the beginning of the end for traditional tonality; The Symphony No. 1 by Antonín Dvorak; Franz Liszt publishes his solo piano transcriptions of the full Beethoven Symphonies 1 – 9. 
 1864 in music Birth of Richard Strauss, German composer, Alberto Nepomuceno, Brazilian composer, pianist, organist and conductor
 1863 in music– The Introduction and Rondo Capriccioso by Camille Saint-Saëns; Birth of Ernesto Nazareth
 1862 in music – Birth of French composer Claude Debussy
 1861 in music – Birth of Anton Arensky; Franz Liszt completes his first Mephisto Waltz The Dance in the Village Inn.
 1860 in music – Birth of Gustav Mahler, Austrian composer and conductor

 1850s 
 1859 in music – Faust by Charles Gounod premieres in Paris; Richard Wagner concludes Tristan und Isolde; In 1859, John Freeman Young published the English translation of Silent Night that is most frequently sung today.
 1858 in music – Births of Medardo Rosso and Giacomo Puccini, Italian opera composer, Orphée aux enfers by Jacques Offenbach, the first operetta, premieres in Paris; Hector Berlioz writes Les Troyens; Johann Strauss II writes Tritsch-Tratsch-Polka
 1857 in music – Birth of Edward Elgar, British composer; First public performance of Franz Liszt's Piano Sonata in B Minor
 1856 in music – Death of Robert Schumann, German composer and pianist; Richard Wagner, German composer, concludes Die Walküre
 1855 in music – Birth of Ernest Chausson
 1854 in music – Richard Wagner, German composer, concludes Das Rheingold
 1853 in music – Il trovatore by Giuseppe Verdi premieres in Rome; La traviata by Verdi premieres in Venice
 1852 in music – Births of Charles Villiers Stanford, Irish composer, teacher and conductor and Francisco Tárrega, Spanish composer and guitarist
 1851 in music – Rigoletto by Giuseppe Verdi premieres in Venice
 1850 in music – Lohengrin by Richard Wagner premieres in Weimar; Foster's Plantation Melodies by Stephen Foster, including "Camptown Races"

 1840s 
 1849 in music – Death of Frédéric Chopin, Polish composer and pianist; Franz Liszt publishes his Three Concert Études, alongside completing Funérailles. 
 1848 in music – Album for the Young by Robert Schumann; Death of Gaetano Donizetti, Italian opera composer
 1847 in music – "Oh! Susanna" by Stephen Foster published; Death of Felix Mendelssohn-Bartholdy, German composer
 1846 in music – Adolphe Sax invents the saxophone
 1845 in music – Tannhäuser by Richard Wagner premières in Dresden; The Violin Concerto by Felix Mendelssohn; Birth of Ángela Peralta
 1844 in music – Birth of Nikolai Rimsky-Korsakov and Charles-Marie Widor
 1843 in music – Birth of Edvard Grieg, Norwegian composer (d. 1907); Minstrel show premieres in United States; Der fliegende Holländer by Richard Wagner premieres in Dresden
 1842 in music – "Lisztomania" sweeps Europe
 1841 in music – Birth of Antonín Dvořák, Czech composer; Nabucco by Giuseppe Verdi
 1840 in music – Birth of Pyotr Ilyich Tchaikovsky, Russian composer; Death of Niccolò Paganini, Italian composer and ultra virtuoso violinist

 1830s 
 1839 in music – Blumenstück by Robert Schumann
 1838 in music – Kinderszenen by Robert Schumann
 1837 in music – Requiem by Hector Berlioz
 1836 in music – Birth of Carlos Gomes, Brazilian composer and opera composer, Les Huguenots by Giacomo Meyerbeer premieres in Paris
 1835 in music – Death of Vincenzo Salvatore Carmelo Francesco Bellini, Italian opera composer, Lucia di Lammermoor by Gaetano Donizetti premieres in Naples; Gaetano Corticelli is in vogue in salons of Bologna, Italy featuring his terzettis and fantasies; I puritani by Vincenzo Bellini premieres
 1834 in music – Die Neue Zeitschrift für Musik first published by Robert Schumann
 1833 in music – Johannes Brahms born
 1832 in music – Death of Muzio Clementi, Italian composer and pianist
 1831 in music – La sonnambula and Norma by Vincenzo Bellini
 1830 in music – Symphonie Fantastique by Hector Berlioz is written; The Hebrides (overture) by Felix Mendelssohn; Anna Bolena by Gaetano Donizetti; and I Capuleti e i Montecchi by Vincenzo Bellini

 1820s 
 1829 in music – The Italian Symphony, the Scottish Symphony, and the Songs Without Words by Felix Mendelssohn; Birth of Anton Rubinstein, Russian composer and ultra virtuoso pianist
 1828 in music – Franz Schubert dies
 1827 in music – Ludwig van Beethoven dies; Winterreise by Franz Schubert; Il pirata by Vincenzo Bellini
 1826 in music – June 5, Death of Carl Maria Friedrich Ernst von Weber, German opera composer. String Quartet No. 14 in C Sharp minor by Ludwig van Beethoven was completed. October 31, Muzio Clementi's complete Gradus ad Parnassum (100 pieces) appears for the first time, simultaneously in Paris, Leipzig and London.
 1825 in music – Birth of Johann Strauss II, Austrian composer; Songs from Sir Walter Scott by Franz Schubert, including "Ellens dritter Gesang" (Schubert's Ave Maria); The Octet by Felix Mendelssohn Antonio Salieri dies
 1824 in music – Birth of Anton Bruckner, Austrian composer and organist; Beethoven's 9th Symphony
 1823 in music – Die schöne Müllerin by Franz Schubert
 1822 in music 1821 in music – Der Freischütz by Carl Maria von Weber, premieres in Berlin
 1820 in music 1810s 
 1819 in music – April 16, The publication of Muzio Clementi's Gradus ad Parnassum Volume II is entered at Stationer's Hall, London. September 13, Birth of Clara Schumann, German pianist and composer.
 1818 in music – Hammerklavier sonate by Ludwig van Beethoven; "Silent Night" written by Josef Mohr and composed by Franz Xaver Gruber, – The first performance of Silent Night on December 25, (Church of St. Nikolaus in Oberndorf, Austria).
 1817 in music – March 1, Muzio Clementi's Gradus ad Parnassum Volume I is published simultaneously in London, Paris and Leipzig.
 1816 in music – Il barbiere di Siviglia (The Barber of Seville) by Gioachino Rossini, premieres in Rome
 1815 in music 1814 in music – Symphony No. 8 by Ludwig van Beethoven 
 1813 in music – Birth of French-Jewish composer and ultra virtuoso pianist Charles-Valentin Alkan; Birth of German composer Richard Wagner; Birth of Italian composer Giuseppe Verdi, Symphony No. 7 by Ludwig van Beethoven
 1812 in music – Birth of German composer Friedrich von Flotow; Birth of Swiss composer and virtuoso pianist Sigismund Thalberg. 
 1811 in music – Birth of Hungarian composer and virtuoso pianist Franz Liszt. 
 1810 in music – Birth of Polish composer and virtuoso pianist Frédéric Chopin; Birth of German composer and virtuoso pianist Robert Schumann; Ludwig van Beethoven completes his Fifth Piano Concerto Emperor.

 1800s 
 1809 in music – Birth of Felix Mendelssohn-Bartholdy, German composer, pianist, organist and conductor; Death of Joseph Haydn, Austrian composer
 1808 in music – Beethoven completes his 6th Symphony "Pastoral", Beethoven's 5th Symphony
 1807 in music – La Vestale by Gaspare Spontini, Symphony No. 4 by Ludwig van Beethoven
 1806 in music –  Fourth Piano Concerto, Violin Concerto by Ludwig van Beethoven
 1805 in music – Fidelio by Ludwig van Beethoven
 1804 in music – Symphony No. 3 'Eroica' by Ludwig van Beethoven 
 1803 in music – Birth of Hector Berlioz, French composer Symphony No. 2 by Ludwig van Beethoven
 1802 in music – Bach's Sonatas and partitas for solo violin are published by Bote and Bock
 1801 in music – Birth of Vincenzo Salvatore Carmelo Francesco Bellini, Italian opera composer, Beethoven's Moonlight Sonata
 1800 in music – Symphony No. 1 by Ludwig van Beethoven

 1790s 
 1799 in music –
 1798 in music – Joseph Haydn's The Creation
 1797 in music – Joseph Haydn's Gott erhalte Franz den Kaiser; Birth of Franz Schubert, Austrian composer and pianist and Domenico Gaetano Maria Donizetti, Italian opera composer
 1796 in music –
 1795 in music – First Beethoven Piano Sonatas written (Op. 2)
 1794 in music –
 1793 in music – Scots Wha Hae
 1792 in music – Birth of Gioachino Antonio Rossini, Italian composer
 1791 in music – Mozart's Die Zauberflöte (The Magic Flute); death of Mozart
 1790 in music –

 1780s 
 1789 in music – Mozart's Così fan tutte
 1788 in music – Death of Carl Philipp Emanuel Bach, German composer and keyboardist
 1787 in music – Mozart's Don Giovanni
 1786 in music – Birth of Carl Maria Friedrich Ernst von Weber, German opera composer, Mozart's Le nozze di Figaro (The marriage of Figaro)
 1785 in music – Wolfgang Amadeus Mozart composes his Piano Concerto No. 21
 1784 in music –
 1783 in music –
 1782 in music – Birth of Niccolò Paganini, Italian composer and ultra virtuoso violinist; Death of Johann Christian Bach, German composer, Mozart's Die Entführung aus dem Serail (The Abduction from the Seraglio)
 1781 in music –
 1780 in music –

 1770s 
 1779 in music –
 1778 in music –
 1777 in music – Il mondo della luna by Joseph Haydn, premieres in Eszterháza, Hungary
 1776 in music –
 1775 in music –
 1774 in music –
 1773 in music –
 1772 in music –
 1771 in music –
 1770 in music – Ludwig van Beethoven born

 1760s 
 1769 in music –
 1768 in music –
 1767 in music –
 1766 in music –
 1765 in music –
 1764 in music – Death of Jean-Philippe Rameau, French composer and music theorist
 1763 in music –
 1762 in music – Orfeo ed Euridice by Christoph Willibald Gluck, premieres in Vienna
 1761 in music –
 1760 in music – La buona figliuola by Niccolò Piccinni, premieres in Rome

 1750s 
 1759 in music – George Frideric Handel dies
 1758 in music –
 1757 in music – Death of Domenico Scarlatti, Italian composer and harpsichordist
 1756 in music – Wolfgang Amadeus Mozart born
 1755 in music –
 1754 in music –
 1753 in music –
 1752 in music – Muzio Clementi born
 1751 in music –
 1750 in music – Johann Sebastian Bach dies, Antonio Salieri born

 1740s 
 1749 in music – Johann Sebastian Bach finishes his Mass in B Minor; George Frideric Handel composes the Music for the Royal Fireworks
 1748 in music  -
 1747 in music – Johann Sebastian Bach finishes his Musical Offering
 1746 in music –
 1745 in music –
 1744 in music – Johann Sebastian Bach finishes the Book II from The Well-Tempered Clavier
 1743 in music –
 1742 in music – première of Messiah by George Frideric Handel, in Dublin
 1741 in music – Death of Antonio Lucio Vivaldi, Italian composer and violinist Bach's Goldberg Variations are published
 1740 in music –

 1730s 
 1739 in music – The Clavier-Übung III by Johann Sebastian Bach is published
 1738 in music –
 1737 in music –
 1736 in music – Alexander's Feast by George Frideric Handel
 1735 in music – Birth of Johann Christian Bach, German composer
 1734 in music –
 1733 in music – La serva padrona by Giovanni Battista Pergolesi, the first opera buffa, premieres in Naples; Hippolyte et Aricie by Jean-Philippe Rameau, premieres in Paris, Death of François Couperin, French composer and harpsichordist
 1732 in music – Joseph Haydn born
 1731 in music –
 1730 in music –

 1720s 
 1729 in music –
 1728 in music – The Beggar's Opera by John Gay and Johann Christoph Pepusch, premieres in London
 1727 in music – Zadok the Priest (the coronation anthem) by George Frideric Handel, Johann Sebastian Bach finishes and presents his St Matthew Passion
 1726 in music –
 1725 in music – publication of Twelve concerti, Op. 8 by Antonio Vivaldi, including the Four Seasons – Death of Alessandro Scarlatti, Italian composer
 1724 in music – Giulio Cesare by George Frideric Handel premières in London, Johann Sebastian Bach presents his St John Passion
 1723 in music –  Vivaldi composes The Four Seasons
 1722 in music – Johann Sebastian Bach finishes the Book I from The Well-Tempered Clavier, Traité de l'harmonie by Jean-Philippe Rameau causes a revolution in music theory.
 1721 in music –
 1720 in music – Johann Sebastian Bach presents his Brandenburg Concertos to Christian Ludwig; Johann Sebastian Bach completes the Sonatas and partitas for solo violin

 1710s 
 1719 in music –
 1718 in music –
 1717 in music – Water Music by George Frideric Handel
 1716 in music – Juditha triumphans is composed by Antonio Vivaldi
 1715 in music –
 1714 in music – Birth of Carl Philipp Emanuel Bach, German composer
 1713 in music – Death: Arcangelo Corelli, Italian composer and violinist
 1712 in music –
 1711 in music – Rinaldo by Handel, premieres in London, the first all-Italian opera performed in London
 1710 in music – Agrippina by Handel, premieres in Venice

 1700s 
 1709 in music –
 1708 in music –
 1707 in music –
 1706 in music – Johann Pachelbel dies
 1705 in music –
 1704 in music –
 1703 in music –
 1702 in music –
 1701 in music –
 1700 in music –

 1690s 
 1699 in music –
 1698 in music –
 1697 in music –
 1696 in music –
 1695 in music – Henry Purcell dies
 1694 in music –
 1693 in music –
 1692 in music –
 1691 in music – King Arthur by Henry Purcell
 1690 in music –

 1680s 
 1689 in music –  Dido and Aeneas, opera, by Henry Purcell and Nahum Tate (libretto) performed
 1688 in music –
 1687 in music – Death of Jean-Baptiste Lully, French composer
 1686 in music –
 1685 in music – Albion and Albanius, opera, by Louis Grabu; Birth of: Johann Sebastian Bach and Georg Friedrich Häendel (German composers, organists and harpsichordists); Domenico Scarlatti, Italian composer and harpsichordist
 1684 in music –
 1683 in music – Birth of Jean-Philippe Rameau, French composer and music theorist
 1682 in music –
 1681 in music –
 1680 in music –

 1670s 
 1679 in music –
 1678 in music – Birth of Antonio Lucio Vivaldi, Italian composer and violinist
 1677 in music –
 1676 in music –
 1675 in music – Psyche by Matthew Locke
 1674 in music –
 1673 in music –
 1672 in music –
 1671 in music –
 1670 in music –

 1660s 
 1669 in music –
 1668 in music – Birth of François Couperin, French composer and harpsichordist
 1667 in music –
 1666 in music –
 1665 in music –
 1664 in music – Heinrich Schutz completes Weihnachtshistorie
 1663 in music –
 1662 in music –
 1661 in music –
 1660 in music – Birth of Alessandro Scarlatti, Italian composer and harpsichordist

 1650s 
 1659 in music – Henry Purcell born
 1658 in music –
 1657 in music –
 1656 in music –
 1655 in music –
 1654 in music –
 1653 in music – Arcangelo Corelli, Johann Pachelbel born
 1652 in music –
 1651 in music – La Calisto by Francesco Cavalli
 1650 in music –

 1640s 
 1649 in music – Giasone by Francesco Cavalli, premieres in Venice, the first opera to separate aria and recitative
 1648 in music –
 1647 in music –
 1646 in music –
 1645 in music –
 1644 in music – Ormindo by Francesco Cavalli, premieres in Venice
 1643 in music – death of Claudio Monteverdi
 1642 in music – L'incoronazione di Poppea by Claudio Monteverdi, premiered in Venice
 1641 in music –
 1640 in music – Il ritorno d'Ulisse in patria by Claudio Monteverdi, premieres in Venice

 1630s 
 1639 in music –
 1638 in music –
 1637 in music – The first commercial opera house open to the public, Teatro San Cassiano, opens in Venice
 1636 in music –
 1635 in music –
 1634 in music –
 1633 in music –
 1632 in music – Birth of Jean-Baptiste Lully, French composer
 1631 in music –
 1630 in music –

 1620s 
 1629 in music –
 1628 in music –
 1627 in music –
 1626 in music –
 1625 in music –
 1624 in music –
 1623 in music –
 1622 in music –
 1621 in music –
 1620 in music –

 1610s 
 1619 in music – Michael Praetorius, Polyhymnia caduceatrix
 1618 in music –
 1617 in music – Johann Hermann Schein, Banchetto musicale
 1616 in music –
 1615 in music –
 1614 in music – Marco da Gagliano, Sacrarum cantionum
 1613 in music –
 1612 in music –
 1611 in music – William Byrd, Fantasia a 6, No. 3; Carlo Gesualdo, Morro lasso al mio duolo
 1610 in music – Claudio Monteverdi, Vespro della Beata Vergine 1610

 1600s 
 1609 in music –
 1608 in music – Lamento d'Arianna by Claudio Monteverdi; Since Robin Hood by Thomas Weelkes
 1607 in music – La Favola D'Orfeo by Claudio Monteverdi
 1606 in music –
 1605 in music – Van de Spiegheling der singconst (ca 1605) by Simon Stevin
 1604 in music –
 1603 in music –
 1602 in music –  by Lodovico Viadana, the first book to feature basso continuo
 1601 in music – Le nuove musiche by Giulio Caccini
 1600 in music – the first oratorio: Rappresentatione di Anima, et di Corpo by Emilio de' Cavalieri

 1590s 
 1599 in music –
 1598 in music –
 1597 in music – John Dowland's First Book of Lute Songs; Dafne, the first known opera
 1596 in music –
 1595 in music –
 1594 in music – Orlande de Lassus completes Lagrime di San Pietro (posthumously published); Orlande de Lassus dies
 1593 in music –
 1592 in music –
 1591 in music –
 1590 in music – Claudio Monteverdi, Il secondo libro de madrigali a 5

 1580s 
 1589 in music –
 1588 in music –
 1587 in music –
 1586 in music –
 1585 in music –
 1584 in music –
 1583 in music –
 1582 in music –
 1581 in music – The court entertainment Ballet comique de la reine by Balthazar de Beaujoyeulx was presented on Oct 15
 1580 in music – Appearance of three Fantasias for viol consort by William Byrd. Founding of Concerto delle donne under the direction of Luzzasco Luzzaschi: Consisting of women voices, this group becomes a significant part of Alfonso II d'Este's court entertainment.

 1570s 
 1579 in music –
 1578 in music –
 1577 in music –
 1576 in music –
 1575 in music –
 1574 in music –
 1573 in music –
 1572 in music –
 1571 in music –
 1570 in music –

 1560s 
 1569 in music –
 1568 in music –
 1567 in music – Birth of Claudio Monteverdi, Italian composer and singer
 1566 in music –
 1565 in music –
 1564 in music –
 1563 in music –
 1562 in music –
 1561 in music –
 1560 in music – First works for Viol Consort attributed to William Byrd

 1550s 
 1559 in music –
 1558 in music –
 1557 in music –
 1556 in music –
 1555 in music –
 1554 in music –
 1553 in music –
 1552 in music –
 1551 in music –
 1550 in music –

 1540s 
 1549 in music –
 1548 in music –
 1547 in music –
 1546 in music – Death of John Taverner, English composer.
 1545 in music –
 1544 in music –
 1543 in music –
 1542 in music –
 1541 in music –
 1540 in music – Birth of William Byrd, English composer; Thomas Tallis begins writing his first works for the Latin church service.

 1530s 
 1539 in music – Jacques Arcadelt's First book of madrigals for four voices is published, the most reprinted madrigal book of the century
 1538 in music – printing of the first Protestant hymn-book, Ein Hubsch new Gesangbuch; publication of the first book of madrigals by Maddalena Casulana, the first printed book of music by a woman in European history.
 1537 in music –
 1536 in music –
 1535 in music –
 1534 in music –
 1533 in music –
 1532 in music –
 1531 in music –
 1530 in music –  is published, the first book of madrigals to use the word 'madrigal' to describe them.  The majority of the pieces in it are by Philippe Verdelot.

 1520s 
 1529 in music –
 1528 in music –
 1527 in music –
 1526 in music –
 1525 in music – birth of Palestrina
 1524 in music –
 1523 in music –
 1522 in music – death of Jean Mouton (c. 1459 – October 30, 1522)
 1521 in music – death of Josquin
 1520 in music –  is published, the first printed book of secular music dedicated to a single composer.  It contains the first madrigals, though they are not called by that name.

 1510s 
 1519 in music –
 1518 in music –
 1517 in music –
 1516 in music –
 1515 in music –
 1514 in music –
 1513 in music –
 1512 in music –
 1511 in music –
 1510 in music – Josquin des Prez composes the Missa de Beata Virgine

 1490s and 1500s 
 1509 in music –
 1508 in music –
 1507 in music –
 1506 in music –
 1505 in music –
 1504 in music –
 1503 in music –
 1502 in music –
 1501 in music – publication of Harmonice Musices Odhecaton by Ottaviano Petrucci, the first printed collection of polyphonic music
 1500 in music –
 1499 in music –
 1498 in music –
 1497 in music –
 1496 in music –
 1495 in music –
 1494 in music –
 1493 in music –
 1492 in music –
 1491 in music –
 1490 in music –

 Early history 

15th century
 Josquin des Prez composes the Domine, ne in fuore tuo
 1490s in music – Josquin des Prez – Nymphes des bois; The Chigi codex is compiled.
 1480s in music – Johannes Ockeghem completes Requiem; Josquin des Prez composes the Missa L'homme armé super voces musicales1460s in music – Anna Inglese sings at the festivities for the marriage of Galeazzo Maria Sforza, Duke of Milan and Bona of Savoy 
 1450s in music – Antoine Busnois writes the O Crux Lignum
 1440s in music – Bianca de' Medici is born
 The Old Hall Manuscript is compiled

14th century
 1370s in music – Death of Guillaume de Machaut
 1360s in music – Guillaume de Machaut composes Messe de Nostre Dame, the first complete polyphonic ordinary of the mass
 1300s in music – Edward I of England holds the Feast of the Swans at Westminster Abbey, with music involving over 150 minstrels from a number of European countries.

13th century
 The Worcester Fragments are compiled.

12th century
 The Magnus Liber is compiled by Léonin
 The Codex Calixtinus is compiled

Ancient music
 1st millennium in music 1st millennium BC in music 2nd millennium BC in music'

See also

 List of years in country music
 List of years in jazz 
 List of years in rock music
 Table of years in music

References

External links 
 Music Timeline A Chronology of Music From Prehistory to the Present Day.

 
Events, List of musical
 
Music
Music